= Consuelo Zavala =

Mexican feminist and teacher

Consuelo Zavala Castillo
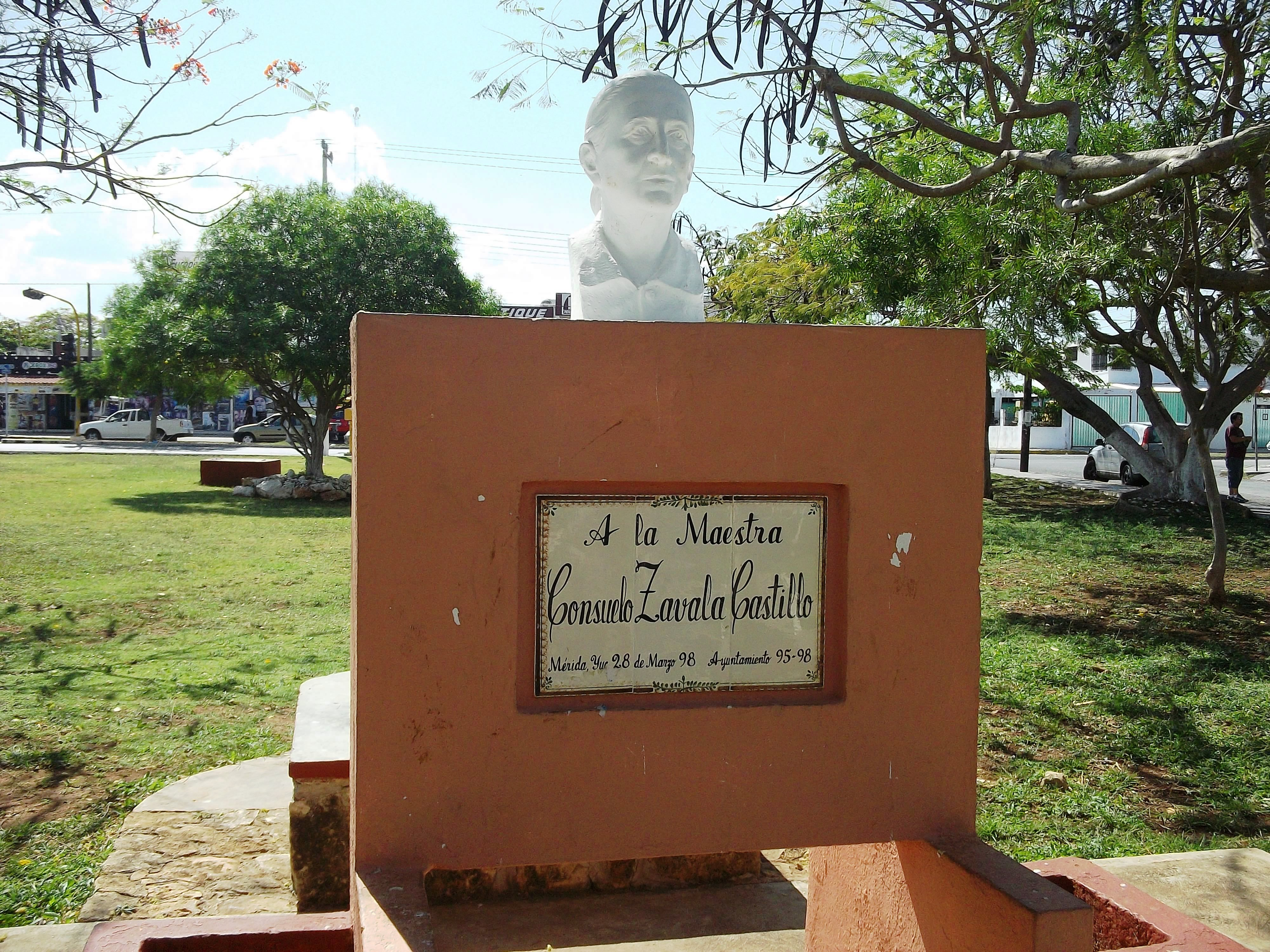
- bust of Consuelo Zavala Castillo, Mérida, Mexico
- Born: 1874; Mérida, Yucatán, Mexico
- Died: 22 June 1956 (aged 81–82); Mérida, Yucatán, Mexico
- Occupations: Educator, feminist
- Known for: Organized the first feminist congress of Mexico; founded first professional kindergarten in Yucatán

Consuelo Zavala Castillo (1874-1956) was a Mexican feminist, teacher, and founder of one of the first secular private schools in Mérida, Mexico. She is credited with establishing the first kindergarten to utilize the Froebel method in Mérida. She was the organizer of the First Feminist Congress in Mexico, authorized by state governor Salvador Alvarado.

== Biography ==
Consuelo Zavala Castillo was born in 1874 in Mérida, Yucatán, Mexico. She studied at the Instituto Literario de Niñas (ILN) (Literary Institute for Girls) under the tutelage of feminist teacher Rita Cetina Gutiérrez. She graduated at the age of 23 with a degree in elementary and higher education. After teaching at various schools in the state, in 1902 she founded her own school, basing the curriculum on secular, scientific education methods. In 1904, Zavala participated in the 5th General Congress on Primary Education.

In 1906, she established the first professional kindergarten in Yucatán, following the Froebel method. In 1912, she was commissioned to study in France by president Francisco I. Madero to learn more about European educational practices.

She was President of the Board of Directors for the Organizing Committee of the First Feminist Congress in Mexico, held in 1916 and authorized by the Governor of Yucatán, Salvador Alvarado. Numerous topics were discussed at the January meeting, but at the center of the discussion was suffrage and the political involvement of all citizens, followed by women's education, women's roles as wives and mothers, and their rights to divorce. A storm of controversy resulted when Hermila Galindo's paper advocating sex education on female sexuality was read. When the second congress was held in December of that same year, Zavala, who had been surprised by the amount of anti-feminist feeling that arose from the first congress, did not attend.

In 1922, as part of the Socialist Party of the Southeast, Zavala helped found the Feminist League of Yucatán with Elvia Carrillo Puerto, Raquel Dzib Cicero, Rosa Torre González, Beatríz Peniche de Ponce and Adolfina Valencia. In 1939, her student Antonia Jiménez Trava became the first woman to graduate with a law degree in Yucatán.

In 1948, she was awarded the Ignacio Manuel Altamirano Medal, recognizing her fifty years as an educator and her distinguished teaching career.

Zavala died on June 22, 1956, in Mérida.

There are six schools in Mexico that bear her name: three in the city of Mérida, one in Akil, Yucatán, one in Kanasín and one in Tizimín.
