= Leonarda Gómez Blanco =

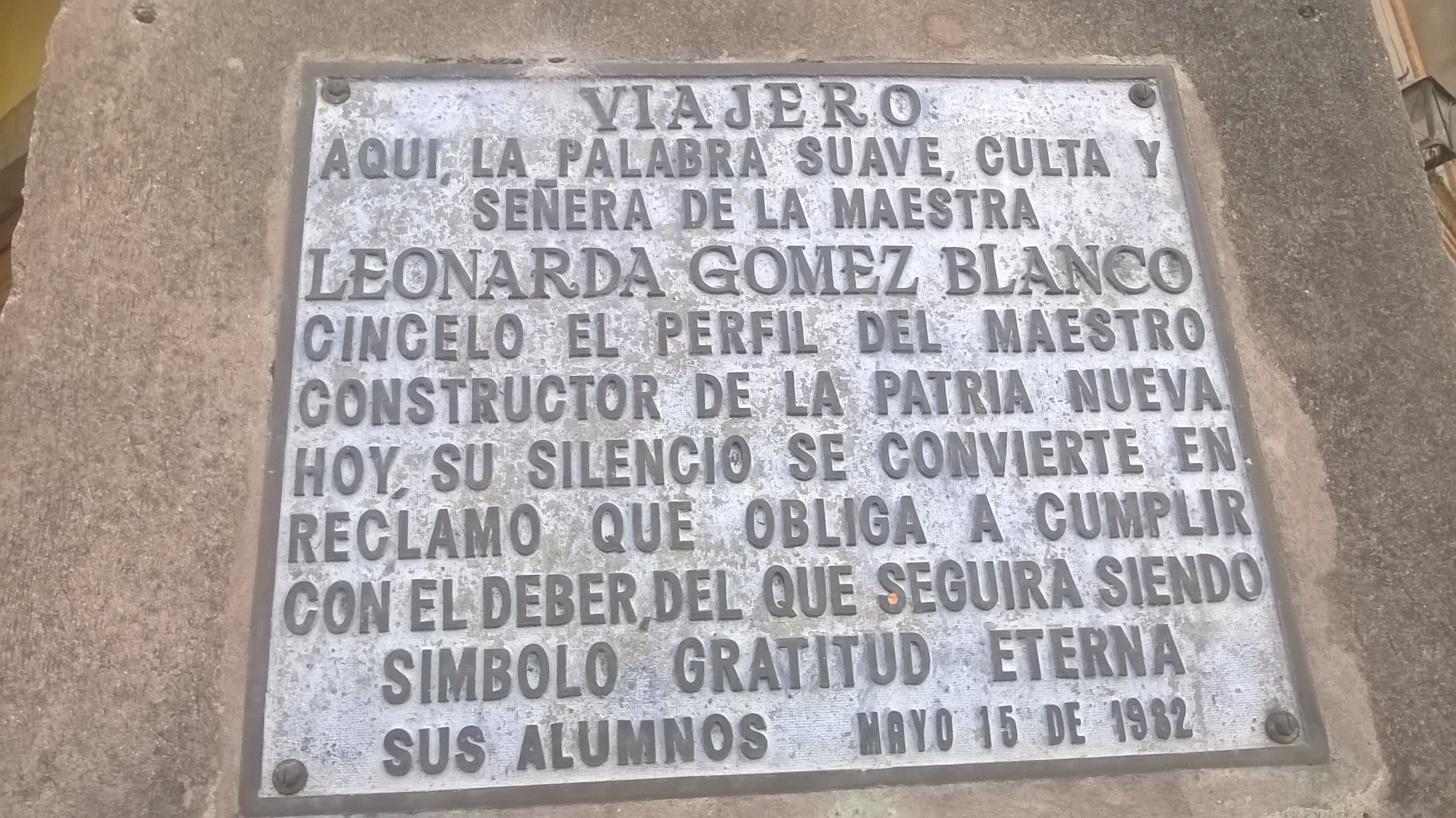
- Born: 21 December 1900; Sotutoha, Yucatán, Mexico
- Died: unknown
- Occupation: educator

Leonarda Gómez Blanco (21 December 1900 - ?) was a Mexican teacher and early member of the Socialist Party of the Southeast. Served as the head of the Cultural Missions Program and Director of Education in both Campeche and Tlaxcala.

== Biography ==
Leonarda Gómez Blanco was born on 21 December 1900 in Sotutoha, Yucatán, Mexico to Mariano Gómez and Emelia Blanco Cardenia. She learned the Maya language and attended elementary school at La Mejorada and later the Instituto Literario de Niñas (ILN) (Literary Institute for Girls) taught by Rita Cetina Gutiérrez. After graduating with her teaching credentials she went on to earn a teaching degree for Kindergarten from Escuela de Educadoras de Mérida (Mérida School of Women Educators).

While in school she studied with Rosa Torre González and Carmen Gosgaya who introduced her to Elvia Carrillo Puerto. The group of friends joined the Socialist Party of the Southeast and adhered to the policies of Salvador Alvarado and later Felipe Carrillo Puerto. During the Mexican Revolution Gómez taught Yaqui troops at the barracks in an elementary school established in San Sebastian. She was named as a Director of the Union of Missionary Teachers and went on to head the SEP Cultural Missions program. She served as the Director of Education in Campeche, organized the rural Normal School in Jalisquillo, Nayarit and was the education director of the Normal School of Soltepec, Tlaxcala.

The State of Tlaxcala has named an award for teachers with 30 years of service the 'Profa. Leonarda Gómez Blanco de Hernández' Silver Medal. There are 5 elementary and secondary schools, a teacher's college, and monuments in the state that bear her name.
