= Beatriz Peniche Barrera =

Mexican writer, teacher and feminist

- Beatriz Peniche de Ponce circa 1924
- Born: 7 November 1893; Mérida, Yucatán, Mexico
- Died: November 27, 1976 (aged 83); Mérida, Yucatán, Mexico
- Other names: Beatríz Peniche Barrera de Ponce, Beatriz Peniche de Ponce
- Occupations: educator, poet, feminist
- Known for: One of the first 3 female elected politicians in Mexico

Beatriz Peniche Barrera (aka: Beatriz Peniche de Ponce; November 7, 1893 – November 27, 1976) was a writer, teacher and Mexican feminist. She was a leader of the Socialist Party of the Southeast and one of the first three women elected to a legislative body in Mexico. She collaborated with writers and poets from Mexico and Cuba, publishing numerous works.

== Biography ==
Beatriz Peniche Barrera was born on 7 November 1893 in Mérida, Yucatán, Mexico. She was the daughter of Primitivo Peniche Peniche and Aurora Barrera Zapata. From an early age, she showed sensitivity and was given piano and mandolin lessons. She had a particular love for poetry and was enrolled in the Instituto Literario de Niñas (ILN) (Literary Institute for Girls) under the tutelage of Rita Cetina Gutiérrez. Peniche qualified as a teacher in 1913 and went to work as an elementary teacher for girls at the school of Fidelia Cámara.

Shortly after the 1915 arrival of Governor Salvador Alvarado into Yucatán, Peniche was named as the Director of the Manuel Cepeda Library. She participated in the First Feminist Congress of Yucatán which occurred in 1916 in Mérida under Alvarado' direction.

In 1922, she helped found the Feminist League of Yucatán, as part of the Socialist Party of the Southeast with Elvia Carrillo Puerto, Raquel Dzib Cicero, Rosa Torre González, Adolfina Valencia and Consuelo Zavala. With the collaboration of Governor Felipe Carrillo Puerto in 1923, Peniche organized the Congress of Journalists meeting held in Mérida that year.

On November 18, 1923, three candidates who were members of the Liga Rita Cetina Gutierrez (League of Rita Cetina Gutiérrez) were elected to the local legislature as candidates of the Socialist Party of the Southeast. Peniche was elected as the representative of the second district of the City of Mérida, Elvia Carrillo Puerto was elected in the District of Izamal, and Raquel Dzib Cicero was elected in the third district of Mérida. Their triumph at the polls was short-lived, as the women were forced out when governor Carrillo Puerto was assassinated in 1924.

Peniche was invited by a group of writers to come to Cuba and collaborate with them. Arriving on April 6, 1925, she remained for about a year. Thereafter, she made regular trips to Cuba and sometimes stayed as long as six months at a time. Her collaborations from this period in Havana appeared in the journals Diario de la Marina (Journal of the Sea) and Mujeres y Bohemia (Women and Bohemia). As part of a Yucatecan state project to open new media markets, Peniche helped create the Diario del Sureste (Journal of the Southeast) in 1931. In about 1943, she and other local writers founded a literary society called Juana de Asbaje. Throughout her life, Peniche published poems and articles in her own name and under the pseudonyms "Miosotis" and "Betty". She published a regular column, called Prismas (Prisms), which appeared in many publications throughout the region.

Peniche married fellow poet, Miguel Ponce Casares (31 January 1890 – 8 February 1978) on 27 November 1915. They had a daughter, Yolanda Ponce Peniche. Peniche died on November 27, 1976.

== Selected works ==
- Lámpara Encendida (1970)
- Beatriz Peniche de Ponce: poesías (1996)
- Poesías (La huella del viento) (1996)
