= First Feminist Congress of Yucatán =

1916 conference in Mérida, Mexico

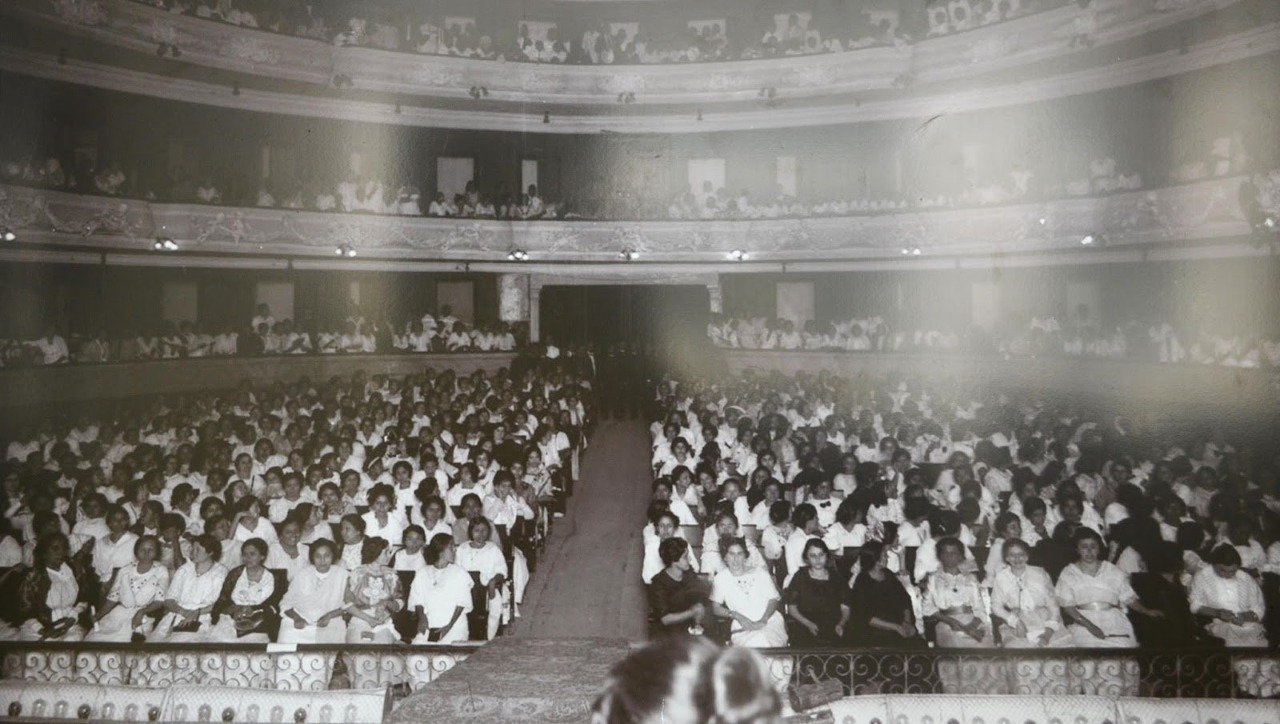
- Delegates to the First Feminist Congress
- Native name: Primer Congreso Feminista de Yucatán
- Date: 13–16 January 1916
- Venue: Peón Contreras Theater
- Location: Mérida, Yucatán, Mexico
- Participants: 620

The First Feminist Congress of Yucatán (Spanish: Primer Congreso Feminista de Yucatán) was a conference that took place from 13 to 16 January 1916 at the Peón Contreras Theater in Mérida, Yucatán, Mexico. The congress brought together 620 delegates, primarily teachers, to discuss and propose reforms for women's social, educational, and legal rights. It was Mexico's first feminist congress and the second in Latin America after the First International Women's Congress, which was held in Argentina in 1910.

Yucatán was a vital hub for Mexican feminism in the late 19th century. Amidst the Mexican Revolution, Yucatán Governor Salvador Alvarado advocated for women's education and introduced labor reforms for women. Alvarado sponsored the congress, which was announced in October 1915 and meticulously planned by an organizing committee led by Consuelo Zavala to address key questions regarding women's freedom, schooling, careers, and role in public life. The opening day of the congress was marked by controversy after the reading of Hermila Galindo's paper on women's sexuality, which led to protests and calls for the paper's destruction. Soon after, the congress fractured into conservative, moderate, and radical factions. Subsequent debates centered on education, civil code reform, and women's suffrage. Though initial positions on suffrage varied, the congress ultimately unanimously approved a petition for women over 21 to hold local office and vote in municipal elections.

The congress garnered international attention and prompted a second congress in late 1916. Its calls for civil code reform directly influenced the 1917 Law of Family Relations, which significantly expanded married women's financial and legal rights. It is considered a foundational event in the history of Mexican feminism. However, some historians, such as Anna Macías and Stephanie J. Smith, argue that the congress's restrictive criteria for participation marginalized working-class and Maya women.

== Background ==
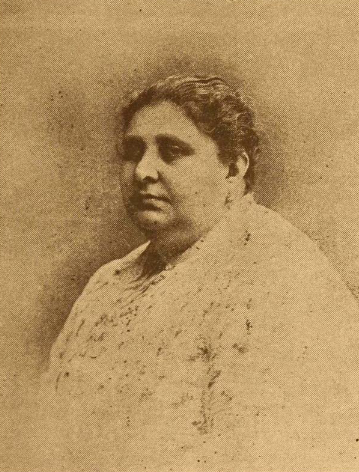
Some sources claim that Rita Cetina Gutiérrez personally taught many of the congress's attendees

During the late 19th century, Yucatán was an important hub for Mexican feminism. This was in part due to its connection to global maritime trade networks. These networks introduced feminist ideals from abroad to the Yucatecan capital, Mérida. Influential educators also contributed to women's empowerment in the state during the turn of the century. These included Rita Cetina Gutiérrez—who co-founded the La Siempreviva (transl. 'Liveforever') school and literary society to educate future female teachers—as well as teachers in the local schools of jurisprudence and medicine. Some sources claim that Cetina personally taught several of the congress's attendees, including Consuelo Zavala, Elvia Carrillo Puerto, (Note: It is possible that Carrillo did not attend the congress at all. See "Initial proceedings and controversy".) Raquel Dzib Cicero, and Rosa Torre González. However, historian Lucrecia Infante Vargas notes that this may be an assumption.

The congress took place amidst the Mexican Revolution, which began in 1910 in opposition to the dictatorship of Porfirio Díaz. Díaz's regime, which lasted for over three decades, was marked by intensified policing, increased government surveillance, and an enlarged prison system. Throughout the 1900s, political reformer Francisco I. Madero opposed the Díaz regime. In Yucatán, Madero's adherents, the Maderistas, and an anti-Díaz faction called the Independent Electoral Center (Spanish: Centro Electoral Independiente, CEI), challenged Díaz's candidate, Enrique Muñoz Arístegui, in the 1909 gubernatorial elections. As a result, many of the opposition leaders were arrested, leading to the failed Valladoid Rebellion. Many of the women who attended the congress were involved in the anti-Díaz opposition.

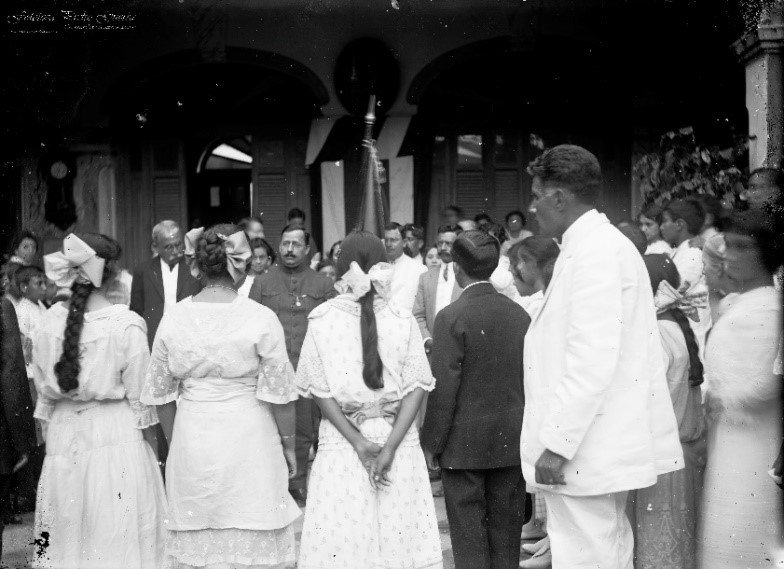
Governor Salvador Alvarado addressing a crowd in 1917

Díaz resigned in May 1911, and after a period of multi-sided conflict spanning several years, Constitutionalist Venustiano Carranza emerged as president of Mexico in 1915. He appointed reformer Salvador Alvarado as governor of Yucatán that same year. Alvarado's government was influenced by his exposure to feminist theories circulating in 19th-century European socialist groups. While he held a paternalistic view of women, believing that their fundamental contribution to society was through their role as wives, he also argued that they were critical for Mexico's modernization. As governor, he introduced a number of reforms targeted at Yucatecan women. Among these reforms were various labor protections for domestic workers, many of whom were Maya women and children, including the abolition of debt bondage. Other labor reforms included the establishment of workplace health standards, limitations on daily work hours, and mandated rest periods for pregnant women. Beyond these tangible reforms, Alvarado also viewed the education of women as being of particular significance, believing that it would equip them to meet their obligations to revolutionary society and enhance their personal well-being.

== Congress ==
=== Preparation and organization ===
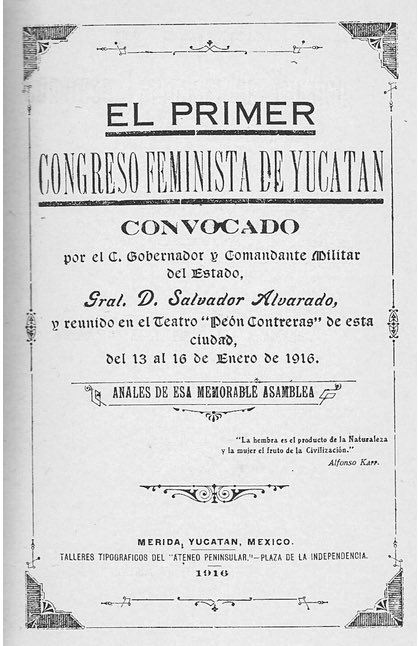
Invitation to the congress

The First Feminist Congress of Yucatán, which was sponsored by Alvarado, was announced in the newspaper La Voz de la Revolución (transl. 'The Voice of the Revolution') on 28 October 1915. The idea for the congress has been attributed to various sources, including schoolteacher Agustín Franco Villanueva and feminist activist Hermila Galindo. The congress was based around four primary questions:

I. What social means should be employed to free women from the yoke of tradition?
II. What is the role of the Primary School in the revindication of women, given that its purpose is to prepare them for life?
III. What arts and occupations, which aim to prepare women for a dynamic life of progress, should the State support and maintain?
IV. What public functions can and should women undertake so as not to be exclusively followers but also leaders in society? (Note: The original Spanish-language text is as follows: "1.- ¿Cuáles son los medios sociales que deben emplearse para manumitir a la mujer del yugo de las tradiciones? 2.- ¿Cuál es el papel que corresponde a la Escuela Primaria en la reivindicación femenina, ya que aquélla tiene por finalidad preparar para la vida? 3.- ¿Cuáles son las artes y ocupaciones que debe fomentar y sostener el Estado, y cuya tendencia sea preparar a la mujer para la vida intensa del progreso? 4.- ¿Cuáles son las funciones públicas que puede y debe desempeñar la mujer a fin de que no solamente sea elemento dirigido sino también dirigente de la sociedad?")

Zavala served as president of the congress's organizing committee, and Dominga Canto served as vice president. The committee held 12 evening meetings between 13 November and 9 January. In that time, Zavala and the committee planned the congress, publicized it, arranged for travel and lodgings for its participants, and selected commissions to address each of the four questions. Five women were nominated and elected to each commission, but many resigned before the congress because of the difficulty of the election process. Some of Alvarado's opponents accused him of making arrangements for the congress too quickly, an accusation that historian Anna Macías claims had "considerable validity".

The congress was extensively publicized, particularly through La Voz de la Revolución. Antonio Ancona Albertos, the director of the newspaper at the time, had extensive ties to the Alvarado government, with historian Shirlene Anne Soto characterizing it as the "semi-official organ of the Constitutionalists", noting that its extensive coverage of Alvarado's announcements and addresses. Two weeks before the congress, Zavala participated in an interview with the newspaper in which she expressed her optimism about the congress, saying: "Oh yes! I am a grand feminist!... I believe that modern woman has the right to struggle".

=== Initial proceedings and controversy ===
The congress began on 13 January 1916 at the Peón Contreras Theater in Mérida. 620 delegates were present, many of whom were teachers. Significant attendees included Dzib, Torre, Zavala, Beatriz Peniche Barrera, and Candelaria Ruz Patrón. Many sources also claim that Elvia Carrillo Puerto attended the congress. (Note: Specifically, Godoy Montañez, Peniche Rivera, Alejandre Ramírez and Torres Alonso, López Ramírez, and Cuéllar Montero all claim that she attended.) However, while Carrillo biographer Dulce María Sauri Riancho acknowledges that it is "very likely" that she participated, she also posits that there is insufficient documentary evidence to prove it. Participants were required to be women of "honest reputation" and to have, at minimum, a grade school education. This effectively barred people of Maya descent from participating.

The congress began with a speech by Alvarado, followed by a waltz and poetry reading. An election was then held to decide the congress's president. With Zavala declining her nomination, Adolfina Valencia de Avila was elected to the position with 340 votes. Subsequently, Cesar A. Gonzalez, a representative of the Department of Education, read Galindo's paper, "Woman in the Future". For unknown reasons, Galindo herself did not attend the conference. Her paper discussed women's sexuality, arguing that women's sex drive is as strong as men's and that educating women in anatomy, hygiene, and physiology was crucial for boosting women's bodily autonomy. The paper garnered considerable controversy. Many of the participants protested the paper's presentation, with one attendee, Francisca Garcia Ortiz, arguing that "if radical opinions triumph, women will weep over their charms, trampled underfoot by themselves". Another participant called for the destruction of Galindo's paper. The paper was initially excluded from the proceedings of the congress due to its "immoral" content, but it was later included in the collected works of the congress, which were published by the Yucatecan government.

=== Further debates ===
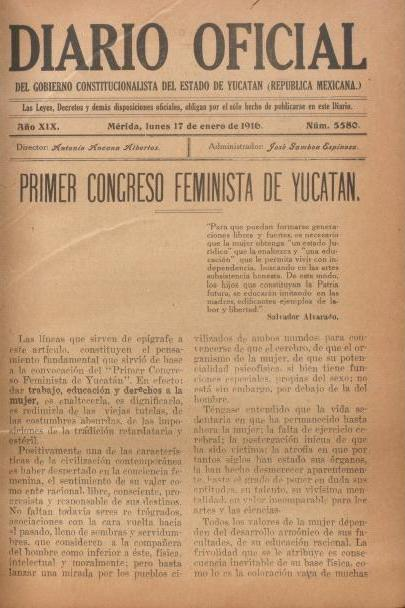
The proceedings of the congress were recorded and published shortly after its conclusion

After Galindo's paper was presented, the congress's participants split into various factions. These included a conservative faction represented by Garcia, a moderate faction represented by Zavala, and a radical faction represented by Porfiria Avila de Rosado. The majority of the delegates belonged to the moderate faction. Regarding education, the moderates argued that opening schools and training teachers would be the most effective ways to liberate women from traditional constraints, that all girls should receive an education, and that schools should equip girls with the self-esteem necessary to pursue professional careers. They further argued that girls under 18 should be taught the "high principles of morality, humanity, and solidarity" instead of receiving a religious education.

Meanwhile, the radical faction called for a "rationalist" approach to education based on the teaching methods of Spanish anarchist Francisco Ferrer. Ferrer advocated for a curriculum based on the natural sciences and rationality, which he believed would foster independent thought and equality in a learning environment free from coercion, competition, political bias, or religious dogma. Zavala noted that most of the delegates were unfamiliar with Ferrer's methods, but that they could potentially be implemented once teachers were trained in them. Both moderates and radicals supported state-sponsored vocational training programs for women in trades such as henequen fibermaking, photography, and silver engraving.

The moderates endorsed a proposal by Avila to reform the Civil Code of 1884 by amending articles that discriminated against women. Specifically, they called for articles that limited women's legal and property rights to be amended, arguing that a single woman should be able to become emancipated by the age of 21, the same as a man. Some members of the conservative faction opposed these reforms, with one delegate arguing that "no reforms to civil legislation should be requested, as the Divorce Law (Note: The Civil Code legalized uncontested divorce.) was sufficient to channel women's freedoms in that direction".

The issue of women's suffrage also divided the congress. The radical faction advocated for women's suffrage and political involvement, with one delegate arguing that because women are equal to men intellectually and morally, they should be allowed to actively participate in society. Both conservatives and moderates initially opposed suffrage. One conservative delegate argued that women are not equal to men physically or morally and should never be allowed to vote, while Zavala, on behalf of the moderates, argued that women, regardless of education, were "not prepared" for the vote at the time, but that future women may be. Another delegate proposed that women be allowed to vote only in municipal elections. By the final day of the congress, 16 January, a petition that proposed changes to the Yucatecan constitution to allow women over 21 to hold local office and vote in municipal elections was unanimously approved by the congress. The congress concluded, in its final presentation to Alvarado, that "the woman of the future can hold any public office that does not require a strong physical constitution, there being no difference between her intellectual state and that of men".

== Outcomes ==
The congress drew the interest of the international community. On 13 March 1916, the chief of the Office of Propaganda of the Revolution received a letter from Japan via Manuel Téllez thanking them for the news of the congress. News of the congress also reached the United States, with American feminist Mary Sheepshanks addressing a letter to Alvarado on 4 November 1916.

Sources differ regarding Alvarado's reaction to the congress. According to historian Aurora Cortina G. Quijano, Alvarado was dissatisfied with the outcome, lamenting that "positive resolutions were not adopted, and some specific issues that addressed radical themes were rejected" due to "time pressure and the lack of adequate preparation of some congresswomen". In contrast, Soto contends that Alvarado was "pleased" with the outcome, citing a report to the president where Alvarado described a "vehement" discussion on "the most adequate ways for making women less religiously fanatic and improving their social conditions", adding that "vibrant speeches were given with grand enthusiasm" and proclaiming it "a new triumph for the revolution".

Due to a lack of clarity regarding the mandate for women's suffrage, Alvarado announced a second congress on 12 June 1916. This congress, which took place from 23 November to 2 December 1916, was not as well attended as the first, with only 234 delegates present. The radical faction successfully proposed a mandate for general women's suffrage at this congress, which passed with a vote of 147 to 89. However, their proposal to allow women to run for municipal office failed, receiving only one-third of the vote.

The demands for civil code reform that arose from the first congress were ultimately reflected in the Law of Family Relations, which was passed on 9 April 1917 with Carranza's support. This law significantly expanded the rights of married women, enabling them to act as guardians, enter contracts, participate in legal suits, and share equal custody rights with men over their children. It also granted women equal authority with their husbands over family finances, permitted paternity suits, and allowed parents to acknowledge illegitimate children.

== Historiography ==
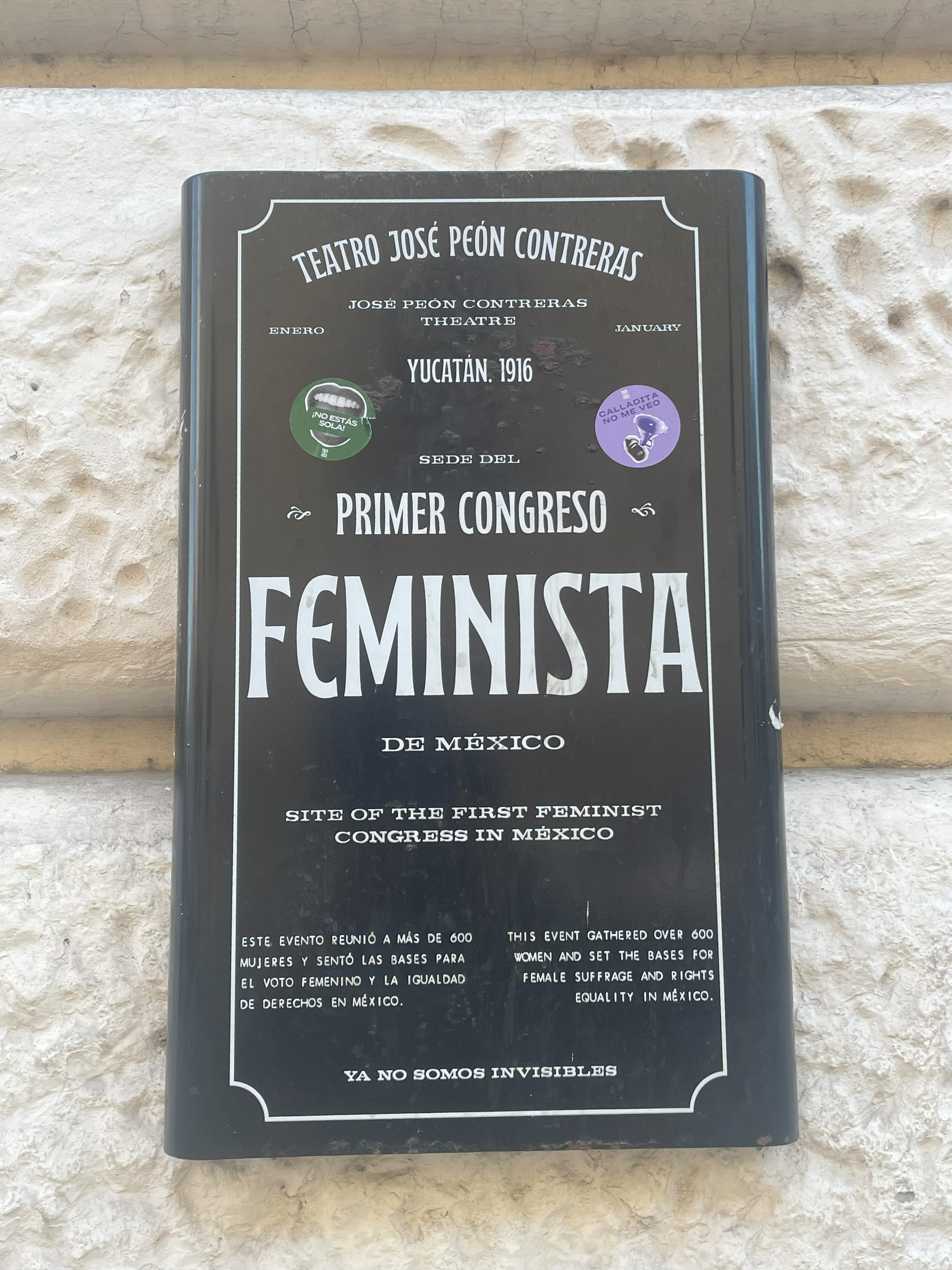
Plaque commemorating the congress at the Peón Contreras Theater

Scholars have offered various interpretations of the congress's legacy. A report published by the Mexican government describes the congress as a crucial event in the history of Mexican feminism, claiming it "planted the seeds" for women to become active contributors to the nation's progress. Academic Jesús Silva Herzog contends that the congress showcased the "progressive leftist spirit" of the state's revolutionary sectors, positioning Yucatán as the most "advanced" state in Mexico. Despite this, Silva claims that the Congress also highlighted significant issues for women, including insufficient legal protections, an inadequate education system, and social traditions that hindered their progress. Ultimately, Silva concludes that the congress successfully demonstrated Mexican women's recognition of their disadvantaged status.

Macías argues that Alvarado's request that only women of "honest reputation" be invited to the congress led to the exclusion of working-class and Indigenous women, limiting participation largely to middle-class mestizo women. Historian Stephanie J. Smith also discusses the exclusion of Maya women, arguing that both feminist congresses, which were largely composed of educated, "modern" women, positioned Maya women as "inferior" and in need of revolutionary "tutoring". Both Macías and Smith note the internal divisions that emerged during the congress, with Macías ultimately concluding that the congress, despite its groundbreaking nature, revealed that only a minority of Yucatecan women were ready for active political involvement at the time.

== See also ==
- Feminism in Mexico
- Women in Mexico
- Soldaderas

== Sources ==
- Alejandre Ramírez, Gloria Luz; Torres Alonso, Eduardo (2016). "El Primer Congreso Feminista de Yucatán 1916. El camino a la legislación del sufragio y reconocimiento de ciudadanía a las mujeres. Construcción y tropiezos" [The First Feminist Congress of Yucatan 1916. The road to suffrage legislation and recognition of women citizenship. Construction and stumbles]. Estudios políticos (in Spanish). 39: 60–89.
- Buchenau, Jürgen (2015). "The Mexican Revolution, 1910–1946". Oxford Research Encyclopedia of Latin American History. New York: Oxford University Press. doi:10.1093/acrefore/9780199366439.013.21. ISBN 978-0-19-936643-9.
- Carey, James C. (1984). The Mexican Revolution in Yucatán, 1915-1924. Boulder: Westview Press. ISBN 0-86531-877-8.
- Cortina G. Quijano, Aurora (1998). "Los Congresos Feministas de Yucatán en 1916 y su influencia en la Legislación Local y Federal" [The Feminist Congresses of Yucatan in 1916 and its influence on Local and Federal Legislation]. Anuario Mexicano de Historia del Derecho (in Spanish). 10: 159–192.
- Cuéllar Montero, Juan Ricardo (2023). "Igualdad y participación política de las mujeres: Elvia Carrillo Puerto" [Equality and political participation of women: Elvia Carrillo Puerto]. Instituto Nacional de Estudios Históricos de las Revoluciones de México (in Spanish).
- Cruz Barney, Óscar (2020). "La codificación civil en México: aspectos generales" [Civil codification in Mexico: general aspects] (PDF). National Autonomous University of Mexico (in Spanish).
- Devereaux Ramírez, Cristina (2015). Occupying Our Space: The Mestiza Rhetorics of Mexican Women Journalists and Activists, 1875-1942. Tucson: University of Arizona Press. ISBN 978-0-8165-0203-5.
- Easterling, Stuart (2012). The Mexican Revolution: A Short History 1910-1920. Chicago: Haymarket Books. ISBN 9781608461837.
- "Enero de 1916. El feminismo mexicano sobre rieles" [January 1916. Mexican feminism on rails]. El Mirador (in Spanish).
- Foppa, Alaide; de Aguilar, Helene F. (1979). "The First Feminist Congress in Mexico, 1916". Signs. 5 (1): 192–199. doi:10.1086/493701. ISSN 0097-9740. JSTOR 3173552.
- Gay, Kathlyn; Gay, Martin K., eds. (1999). "Ferrer, Francisco y Guardia (1859–1909)". Encyclopedia of Political Anarchy. Santa Barbara: ABC-CLIO. pp. 75–77.
- Infante Vargas, Lucrecia (2015). "Rita Cetina Gutiérrez: Primera Mentora Yucateca (1846–1908)" [Rita Cetina Gutiérrez: First Yucatecan Mentor (1846–1908)]. Colección las maestras de México: Rita Cetina, Dolores Correa, Laura Méndez, Rosaura Zapata [Collection of the teachers of Mexico: Rita Cetina, Dolores Correa, Laura Méndez, Rosaura Zapata] (in Spanish). Mexico City: Instituto Nacional de Estudios Históricos de las Revoluciones de Mexico. pp. 21–46. ISBN 978-607-9419-15-8.
- López Ramírez, Claudia Adriana (2018). "Rita Cetina Gutiérrez, una Esctitora "Inédita" del México Decimonónico" [Rita Cetina Gutiérrez, an "Unpublished" Writer of Nineteenth-Century Mexico]. In Romano, Yolanda; Velázquez García, Sara (eds.). Las inéditas: voces femeninas más allá del silencio [The unpublished: female voices beyond silence] (in Spanish). Salamanca: Ediciones Universidad de Salamanca. pp. 553–565. ISBN 978-84-9012-887-9.
- Macías, Anna (1978). "Felipe Carrillo Puerto and women's liberation in Mexico". In Lavrin, Asunción (ed.). Latin American Women: Historical Perspectives. Westport: Greenwood. pp. 286–301. ISBN 0-313-20309-1.
- Macías, Anna (1982). Against All Odds: The Feminist Movement in Mexico to 1940. Westport: Greenwood. ISBN 0-313-23028-5.
- Menéndez de la Peña, Rodolfo (2011) [1909]. Rita Cetina Gutiérrez: 1846-1908 (in Spanish). Mérida: Ilustres Maestros de Yucatán, Casa de la Historia de la Educación de Yucatán. OCLC 1457926311.
- Overmyer-Velázquez, Mark (2008). "Porfiriato". The Oxford Encyclopedia of the Modern World. Oxford: Oxford University Press.
- Peniche Rivero, Piedad (2015). Rita Cetina, La Siempreviva y el Instituto Literario de Niñas [Rita Cetina, The Siempreviva and the Girls' Literary Institute] (in Spanish). México City: Instituto Nacional de Estudios Históricos de las Revoluciones de México. ISBN 978-607-9419-47-9. OCLC 952578746.
- Ross, Stanley R. (2019). Francisco I. Madero: Apostle of Mexican Democracy. New York: Columbia University Press. ISBN 9780231882613.
- Sauri Riancho, Dulce María (2021). Elvia Carrillo Puerto: Violencia política y resiliencia [Elvia Carrillo Puerto: Political Violence and Resilience] (PDF) (in Spanish). Mexico City: Cámara de Diputados. ISBN 978-607-8812-10-3.
- Smith, Stephanie J. (2009). Gender and the Mexican Revolution: Yucatán Women and the Realities of Patriarchy. Chapel Hill: The University of North Carolina Press. ISBN 978-0-8078-3284-4.
- Soto, Shirlene Ann (1990). Emergence of the Modern Mexican Woman: Her Participation in Revolution and Struggle for Equality, 1910-1940. Denver: Arden Press. ISBN 978-0-912869-12-4.
