= Raquel Dzib Cicero =

Mexican educator and legislator

- Born: 1882; Mérida, Yucatán, Mexico
- Died: 14 March 1949 (aged 66–67); Mérida, Yucatán, Mexico
- Occupation: Educator
- Years active: 1898-1949
- Known for: One of the first three female elected politicians in Mexico

Raquel Dzib Cicero (1882–1949) was a teacher and Mexican feminist. She was an early member of the Socialist Party of the Southeast and one of the first three women elected to a legislative body in Mexico. She taught for over fifty years and was still teaching at the time of her death.

== Biography ==
Raquel Dzib Cicero was born in 1882 in Mérida, Yucatán, Mexico to Justo Pastor Dzib and Francisca Cicero. In spite of her family's poverty, Dzib was determined to improve her education. She enrolled in the Instituto Literario de Niñas (ILN) (Literary Institute for Girls) under the direction of Rita Cetina Gutiérrez. Dzib graduated as a teacher in 1898 and taught at several schools throughout the state, including her alma mater. Her specialties were arithmetic, the Spanish language and line drawing, and she held the Chair of Castilian grammar at the Adolfo Cisneros Cámara Secondary School.

She participated in the First Feminist Congress of Yucatán which occurred in 1916 in Mérida under the auspices of governor Salvador Alvarado. The Liga de Profesores (Teacher's League) was formed in 1918, and Dzib served as its treasurer, scrupulously accounting for the funds. In 1922, she helped found the Feminist League of Yucatán, as part of the Socialist Party of the Southeast with Elvia Carrillo Puerto, Beatriz Peniche de Ponce, Rosa Torre González, Adolfina Valencia and Consuelo Zavala.

On November 18, 1923, three candidates who were members of the Liga Rita Cetina Gutierrez (League of Rita Cetina Gutiérrez) were elected to the local legislature as candidates of the Socialist Party of the Southeast. Dzib was elected as the representative of the third district of the City of Mérida, Elvia Carrillo Puerto was elected in the District of Izamal, and Peniche was elected in the second district of Mérida. Their triumph at the polls was short-lived, as the women were forced out when governor Felipe Carrillo Puerto was assassinated in 1924. Dzib withdrew from politics after the assassination and dedicated her life to education. She was later elected a member of the jury of honor and justice for the Sindicato Nacional de Trabajadores de la Educación (SNTE) (National Union for Education Workers).

When she had reached 50 years of teaching, Dzib was awarded a gold service medal. In her honor, the government of Yucatán awards the Raquel Dzib Cicero Medal annually to all teachers who have reached 30 years of uninterrupted service. Dzib died 14 March 1949, in Mérida, and was still teaching at that time.
