= Antonia Jiménez Trava =

Mexican attorney

- Born: Antonia Georgina Alemania Jiménez Trava; 25 February 1917; Mérida, Yucatán, Mexico
- Died: 16 March 2011 (aged 94); Mérida, Yucatán, Mexico
- Occupation(s): Lawyer and educator
- Years active: 1939–1990

Antonia Jiménez Trava (25 February 1917 – 16 March 2011) was a Mexican attorney. She was the first female law graduate from UADY, and the first woman appointed to public office in Yucatán. She served as the first Director of the Civil Registry, the first President of the Electoral Institute of the State, and the first President of the Judiciary. She was a feminist, writing her dissertation on the legality of denying women the vote and when appointed to run the Civil Registry, she eliminated discriminatory texts from the marriage ceremony.

== Biography ==
Antonia Georgina Alemania Jiménez Trava was born on 25 February 1917 to Julio Jiménez Rivero and Pastora Trava Castilla in Mérida, Yucatán, Mexico. She was affectionately called "Toto". Her mother was a teacher at the Instituto Literario de Niñas (ILN) (Literary Institute for Girls) run by Rita Cetina Gutiérrez and Jiménez studied with one of Cetina's students, Consuelo Zavala at her Colegio de Consuelo Zavala.

In 1937, Jiménez became the first woman in Yucatán to sign as a witness for a civil wedding. In July 1939, she became the first woman in Yucatán to graduate with a law degree from Universidad Autónoma de Yucatán. Her thesis was entitled "Women and Political and Civil Rights" examined inequality in society between genders and argued that the vote could not be denied women because the law did not distinguish between men and women politically.

In July 1941 she began working at the Labor Justice Group as Secretary of the Board of Conciliation and Arbitration and by 1964 had become the Board's president, a position she held until 1970. Her appointment in 1941 was the first appointment of a woman to a public office.

She was a professor at the Faculty of Law from 1948 to 1984, taught at the High School of the University of Yucatán from 1965 to 1971, and gave lectures at the Escuela Normal Rodolfo Menéndez de la Peña (Teachers College of Rodolfo Menéndez de la Peña) in Mérida.

She was appointed by Governor Agustín Franco Aguilar to serve as Director of the Civil Registry of the State the first state director to serve in the office. She held that position from 1958 to 1964 having jurisdiction over marriage licensing. As director, Jiménez struck from the wording of the marriage ceremony, the Epistle of Melchor Ocampo. She was honored for her attempts to legally recognize gender equality by the magazine "La Mujer de Hoy" a decade later. Jiménez said that she won $1000 pesos from the magazine for submitting the changed wording, which she changed because it made women slaves to men.

From 1964 to 1970 she served as president of the Regional Minimum Wage Commission and was the chair of the State Electoral Commission from 1970 to 1971. She was the first president of the Electoral Institute in the state of Yucatán.

In January 1972, she became a Judge of the Superior Court of the State of Yucatán and served in that capacity until 1976. Simultaneously to being appointed judge, she was named as president of the Superior Court and became first woman in Mexico to serve as the head of a Superior Court. From 1986 to 1988, she directed the Training Institute of the Judiciary for Yucatán.

Jiménez died 16 March 2011 in Mérida, Yucatán, Mexico.

== Honors ==
- "Master Ignacio I. Altamirano Medal" 1984
- "Medal Eligio Ancona" 1988, granted by the Government of the State of Yucatán.
- "Medal Hector Victoria", 1991, granted by the Legislature
- "Medal Manuel Crescencio Rejón" granted by the Judiciary of the State of Yucatán. Year 1992
- "Medal Confederation of Workers of Mexico (CTM)" awarded by the Confederation of Workers of Mexico on January 20, 1995
- "Medal Manuel Crescencio Rejon and Alcala" awarded by the National Commission on Courts of the United States of Mexico. CONATRIB. 2003
- "Medal of Legal Merit Rafael Matos Escobedo" granted by the government of Yucatán 2010

In Mérida, there are streets, a neighborhood, and the Women's Lawyer's Association of the Yucatán are named for Jiménez Trava.
