= Dolores Correa Zapata =

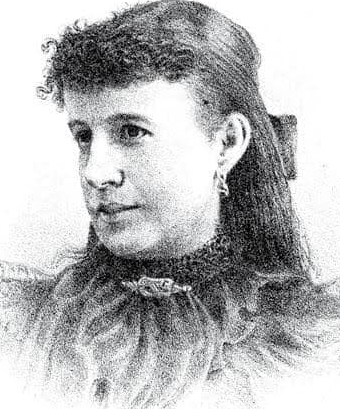
- undated
- Born: February 23, 1853; Teapa, Tabasco, Mexico
- Died: May 24, 1924 (aged 71); Mexico City
- Occupations: teacher; writer; poet; advocate for women's rights; magazine founder
- Writing career
- Genres: non-fiction; poetry
- Notable work: "La Mujer Científica"

Dolores Correa Zapata (1853 – Mexico City, May 24, 1924) was a Mexican teacher, writer, poet, and advocate for women's rights. Together with Columba Rivera, she founded the magazine Mujer Mexicana (Mexican Woman; 1902–07).

== Early life ==
Dolores Correa Zapata was born in Teapa, Tabasco, on February 23, 1853. Because her father had been exiled to Cuba alongside other liberals, Dolores spent her childhood and part of her adolescence in the city of Mérida, where her father served as Jefe político superior in 1863. By 1867, the Correa Zapata family was back in the state of Tabasco, this time living in the city of San Juan Bautista (now Villahermosa).

Her parents were the Yucatán liberal politician and educator Juan Correa Torres (1825–1892) and the Tabascan educator María de Jesús Zapata Roig (1825–1909). Dolores was the third of at least eight children born to the couple; their children included the educator and official Alberto Correa Zapata (1849–1909), the writer Juan Correa Zapata (1857–1946), the lawyer Armando Correa Zapata (1862–1926), and the novelist Teutila Correa de Carter (1863–1938). Dolores' maternal aunt was the feminist writer Catalina Zapata de Puig (1833–1892), and her maternal grandfather, Manuel Zapata Zavala (1802–1868), was a Yucatecan liberal politician who served as a deputy to the Extraordinary Constituent Congress of 1847.

Her great-grandmother's brother was the Yucatecan politician and historian Lorenzo de Zavala, who would later serve as Vice President of the Republic of Texas. Lorenzo's granddaughter (and thus Dolores's cousin) was the poet and teacher Gertrudis Tenorio Zavala; together with Rita Cetina Gutiérrez and Cristina Farfán, she founded the magazine La Siempreviva and the Scientific and Literary Society of the same name.

== Career ==
In San Juan Bautista, her parents founded two schools: the "Instituto Ocampo" for boys, directed by her father, and alongside it, the Colegio María for young women, directed by Dolores and her mother, the first and only private establishments of that era where instruction was exclusively secular. It was during those early years of teaching that Correa began to hone her skills as a writer, contributing to El Recreo del Hogar, a newspaper founded by Cristina Farfán.

According to Laureana Wright de Kleinhans in the "Biographies" section of Violetas del Anáhuac, Correa's constitution was delicate; her physical strength did not match her moral energy,. The demands of her schoolwork undermined her health to such an extent that she had to give up her classes. In 1884, she moved again, accompanied by her brother, Don Alberto, then the publisher of the children’s periodical titled El Escolar Mexicano.

To take her professional examination and become a certified teacher, Dolores moved to Mexico City in 1884. Shortly thereafter, on June 19, 1884, she took the exam at the Colegio de doña María de Aragón, where she was examined in geography, cosmography, arithmetic and the decimal metric system, Spanish, and pedagogy. The geographer Antonio García Cubas was one of her examiners.

In 1889, she began working as a librarian at the Normal School for Women Teachers, and in the next year, she became the assistant director of the Primary Instruction School attached to the Normal School. During the last decade of the 19th century, she published the book Nociones de instrucción cívica, de derecho usual y de economía política (Notions of Civic Instruction, Common Law, and Political Economy), which became an official textbook for girls' primary schools (with the exception of the final section). On November 27, 1896, she was appointed lead instructor for the Domestic Economy class at the Normal School for Women Teachers, and that same year, she published her second textbook, La mujer en el hogar (The Woman in the Home), which won an award at the Buffalo fair. Other textbooks she authored include Moral e instrucción cívica (Morality and Civic Instruction) and Memorias de una maestra (Memoirs of a Teacher).

Alongside her teaching duties, Correa cultivated her interest in poetry, publishing her first book of verse (dedicated to her mother) titled Estelas y bosquejos (Wakes and Sketches), in 1886. In 1917, she published her second book of verse, titled Mis Liras (My Lyres). In late 1886, Correa published, through the Eduardo Dublán printing house, the work for which she is perhaps best known to this day: "La Mujer Científica" (The Scientific Woman). The poem was well received by the press, as its primary aim was to demonstrate that science "is an attribute that should not be denied to the 19th-century woman." Years later, starting with issue number 30 of the magazine Violetas del Anáhuac (dated July 1, 1888), this work began to be reprinted in installments, bringing its ideas to an even wider audience. She was also a frequent contributor to the magazine Violetas de Anáhuac, where, alongside Laureana Wright, Mateana Murguía de Aveleyra, and other women writers, she published literary works reflecting the concerns of the educated women of the era.

== Selected works ==
=== Non-fiction ===
- (1886) La mujer científica
- (1890s) Nociones de instrucción cívica, de derecho usual y de economía política
- (1919 [1896]) La mujer en el hogar. Libro primero
- (1905 [1896]) La mujer en el hogar. Libro segundo
- Moral e instrucción cívica
- Memorias de una maestra (Memoirs of a Teacher)

=== Poetry books ===
- (1886) Estelas y bosquejos
- (1917) Mis Liras

=== Poems and essays published in Violetas de Anáhuac ===
- A la Señora Baronesa de Wilson
- La Rosa Reina
- La Suicida (2-Nov-1888)
- La Loca del Cementerio (7-Oct-1888)
- Pinceladas (7-Oct-1888)
- Un Arroyuelo (30-Sep-1888)
- No matar (Los egoístas) (18-Dec-1887 - 25-Dec-1887)
- El Ángel del Hogar
- A Tabasco (4-Dec-1887)
- México Libre (16-Sep-1888)
- Cantarcillos (2-Sep-1888)
- Adiós (26-Aug-1888)
- Himno Infantil (12-Aug-1888)
- Recuerdos de Puyacatengo (5-Aug-1888)
- Las dos Liras (5-Aug-1888)
- Mi inspiración (18-Nov-1888)
- La Mujer (25-Dec-1887)
- La Mujer Cristiana (05-Feb-1888)
- La Mujer Científica (01-Jul-1888 - 22-Jul-1888)
- Tormenta y calma (29-Jan-1888)
- Los ambiciosos (12-Feb-1888 - 4-Mar-1888)
- Rosas marchitas (19-Feb-1888)
- Desde el cielo (19-Feb-1888)
- El Poeta (18-Mar-1888)
- Al Grijalva, en la inundación de 1870 (25-Mar-1888)
- Estelas y bosquejos (25-Mar-1888)
- El recuerdo (22-Apr-1888)
- La romántica (22-Apr-1888)
- Bajo diversos prismas (6-May-1888 - 17-Jun-1888)
- Una azucena (20-May-1888)
- Soneto (3-Jun-1888)
- Un mendigo (10-Jun-1888)
- Ya comprendo por qué! (17-Jun-1888)
- Soneto (17-Jun-1888)
- El cóndor y el pucuy (24-Jun-1888)
- La mujer de gran mundo (24-Jun-1888)
