= La Siempreviva =

19th-century Mexican literary society

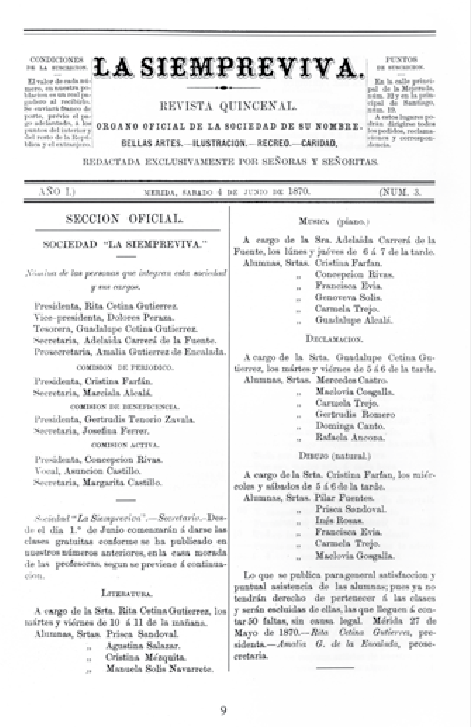
- Directory of the La Siempreviva society
- Formation: 1870; 156 years ago
- Founders: Rita Cetina Gutiérrez; Gertrudis Tenorio Zavala; Cristina Farfán
- Dissolved: 1886; 140 years ago
- Type: Literary society
- Location: Mérida, Mexico

La Siempreviva (transl. 'Liveforever') was a Mexican literary society founded in 1870 by Rita Cetina Gutiérrez, Gertrudis Tenorio Zavala, and Cristina Farfán in Mérida, Yucatán. Named for the liveforever plant, the society aimed to promote fine arts, charity, and education for women in the state. As part of its mission, La Siempreviva founded a periodical and school, both of which were also called La Siempreviva.

The periodical, which operated from 1870 to 1872, helped to promote feminism in Yucatán and acted as a venue for women to create networks of association throughout Mexico. The school, which operated in two periods from 1871 to 1877 and from 1879 to 1886, provided opportunities for girls in Yucatán to receive education in fine arts and other disciplines at a time when such opportunities were limited.

Several major figures in the Mexican feminist movement attended the La Siempreviva school, including Elvia Carrillo Puerto and Dolores Correa Zapata. Overall, La Siempreviva is seen as having played a key role in advancing women's rights, both in Yucatán and Mexico as a whole.

== History ==
=== Establishment ===
The periodical La Siempreviva began publication on 7 May 1870 with the support of Governor Manuel Cirerol y Canto. The society itself was officially founded on 4 June 1870 by Rita Cetina Gutiérrez, Gertrudis Tenorio Zavala, and Cristina Farfán. All three women were middle-class, privately-educated Catholics who enjoyed a high degree of autonomy within Yucatecan society. Aside from the founders, other early members included Dolores Peraza, who served as vice president; Guadalupe Cetina Gutiérrez, who served as treasurer; and Adelaida Carrerá de la Fuente, who served as secretary.

The society was named for the liveforever plant, a medicinal herb known both for its healing properties and perennial nature. Its goals were to develop an appreciation for the fine arts among women, engage in charitable activities, and to "make women completely emerge from the slavery of ignorance and enter with slow but firm steps into the sacrosanct temple of truth and science." At the time, the idea of women engaging in artistic endeavors was seen as objectionable in Yucatácan, with criticisms levied against female writers both by established authors and Yucatecan press organs like La Razon del Pueblo (transl. 'The Reason of the People').

Structurally, La Siempreviva was divided into three committees: the "Comisión del periódico," (transl. 'Periodical commission') which was chaired by Farfán; the "Comisión de beneficienca," (transl. 'Charity commission') which was chaired by Tenorio; (Note: Specifically, Gertrudis Tenorio Zavala. Names used in this article use Spanish naming conventions. In this case, her paternal surname is Tenorio while her maternal family name is Zavala.) and the "Comisión activia," transl. 'Active commission') chaired by Concepción Rivas. Each committee also had its own secretary: Marciana Alcalá for the Comisión de periódico, Josefina Ferrer for the Comisión de beneficienca, and Margarita Castillo for the Comisión activia.

=== The La Siempreviva school ===
Around the time of the society's establishment, girls in Mexico were rarely given schooling at all. Those who were able to attend school usually went to one of the "Amigas" (transl. 'Friends') schools, where they learned skills such as catechism, sewing, reading, and, less commonly, writing. The creation of a school to supplement the society's mission was discussed in the first issue of the La Siempreviva periodical, with plans outlined for classed in drawing, literature, music, and recitation.

These classes were offered in some capacity at the society's headquarters in the La Mejorada neighborhood of Mérida, though the school proper was not established until 3 May 1871. (Note: Not all sources agree on the exact year. According to Menéndez, one of Rita Cetina's biographers, the school "opened on [3 May] 1870," while according to Peniche, a later biographer, "a document in [Cetina's] own handwriting says that it was founded a year later, on 3 May 1871." Peniche argues that the 1871 date is more plausible, pointing out that La Siempreviva's expenditures do not feature any educational expenses for the first year of the society's existence.) It offered classes in arithmetic, astronomy, geography, geometry, grammar, handwriting, history, home economics, hygiene, and religious studies. Teachers at the school included Rita Cetina and her sister Guadalupe; Gertrutis Romero; Josefina Tenorio; Genoviva Solis; Coralina Meléndez de Flores; and Adelaida Carrerá de la Fuente, the secretary of La Siempreviva. It was funded by a mix of government subsidies and sales from the La Siempreviva periodical.

The La Siempreviva school closed on 16 December 1877 due to the establishment of the Instituto Literario de Niñas (transl. 'Girls' Literary Institute'). The teachers at the La Siempreviva school all went to teach at the new Instituto, as did La Siempreviva student Dominga Canto. La Siempreviva's Rita Cetina was appointed as director of the Instituto.

Rita Cetina resigned from her position at the Instituto two years later on 1 March 1879, after which she reopened La Siempreviva. Many teachers left the Instituto in sympathy with Cetina, joining the staff of the newly reconstituted La Siempreviva school. Around 80 girls were enrolled in the reopened school, many of whom were previously enrolled at the Instituto, and Rita Cetina made efforts to integrate La Siempreviva into the Instituto. However, La Siempreviva closed permanently in October 1886, when the new Yucatán Governor Guillermo Palomino appointed Rita Cetina to lead the Instituto once again.

== The La Siempreviva periodical ==
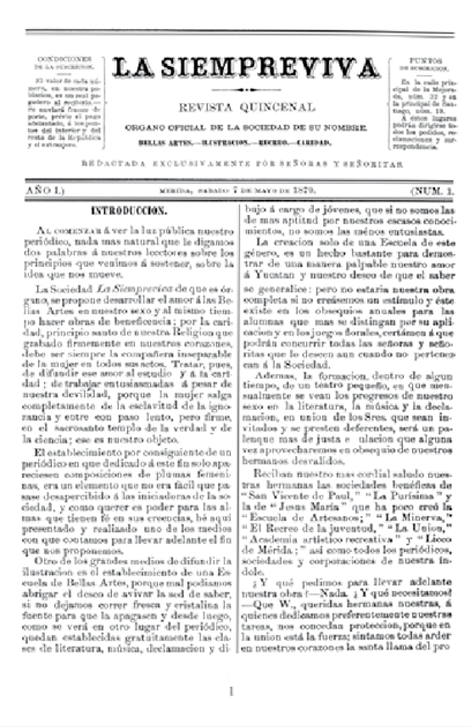
Cover of the first issue of La Siempreviva, 1870

The La Siempreviva periodical published 43 issues over two years, beginning in 1870. Issues cost one real and were published every two weeks. They were generally short, consisting of four pages with each page split into two columns. A variety of essays, poems, and translations appeared in the periodical's "Sección literaria” (transl. 'Literary section'). Writers published by La Siempreviva included Catalina Zapata and Genoveva Gutiérrez. Other writers also contributed under pseudonyms such as "BS," "Clara," "L***," and "RR." Various women served as editor-in-chief of the periodical, including Rita Cetina, Farfán, and Tenorio. Its motto, printed at the top of every issue, was "Bellas Artes, Ilustración, Recreo, Caridad" (transl. 'Fine Arts, Illustration, Recreation, Charity').

La Siempreviva has been credited by historian Piedad Peniche Rivero with raising feminist consciousness and fostering a sense of sisterhood between society members. All content for the periodical was written by women and women were actively sought as potential owners and financial beneficiaries of the publication. It challenged patriarchal norms by discussing women who had entered the workplace, mostly abroad, but in some cases, in Yucatán itself. However, due to their personal affiliations with the church and with the Yucatecan elite, contributors to La Siempreviva often attempted to balance their calls for women's enlightenment with discussions of religious morality. For example, in an 1870 essay published in La Siempreviva, Rita Cetina wrote the following:

Endowed by Providence with intellectual faculties like man, we would like to see [women] placed on the same level as man, sharing with him [her work] materially and mentally... Why then, if God gave both a soul and an intelligence entirely equal, should woman be deprived of the freedom to think, discern and deliberate like man? Why keep her mired in ignorance and employ her only in material work?... We want, therefore, that woman be educated so that, by encompassing in her intelligence all the knowledge of man, she may investigate and discover, like him, the arcane secrets of nature.

La Siempreviva ceased operations in 1872 at the end of Manuel Cirerol y Canto's governorship, which coincided with a reduction in government support.

== Collaboration with other organizations ==
Over the course of its sixteen-year existence, La Siempreviva participated in various collaborative projects. The La Siempreviva periodical engaged in editorial collaborations with over 45 newspapers and periodicals throughout Mexico, creating a network of female writers who became involved in the struggle for women's emancipation. The organization as a whole also collaborated extensively with various educational institutions, including La Encarnación (transl. 'The Incarnation'), an educational institute for girls whose students frequently contributed to translations to the La Siempreviva periodical, and the Conservatorio Yucateco (transl. 'Yucatecan Conservatory'), a liberal institution that taught fine arts in a mixed-gender setting with children of various social classes.

== Legacy ==
Several students who attended the La Siempreviva school went on to play major roles in the Mexican feminist movement, including Elvia Carrillo Puerto and Dolores Correa y Zapata. Carillo went on to found the Liga Feminista Rita Cetina Gutiérrez (transl. 'Rita Cetina Gutiérrez Feminist League'), which was named for the co-founder of La Siempreviva and gave lectures to women on subjects such as home economics, childcare, and hygiene.

On 7 May 2022, the Ya No Somos Invisibles (transl. 'We are No Longer Invisible') collective placed a plaque commemorating the La Siempreviva school at the corner of 59th and 52nd street in Mérida, where the school was originally located. Reporting on the plaque, the advocacy group Proyecto Libres (transl. 'Free Project') reflected on the legacy of the La Siempreviva school, calling it a "watershed for the exercise of rights for women in the state and country."

== Sources and further Reading ==
- Avelar Mayer, María de los Ángeles (2011). La Siempreviva. Voz Pionera del Sur (1870-1872) [La Siempreviva. Pioneer Voice of the South (1870-1872)] (Bachelor's thesis) (in Spanish). Universidad Nacional Autónoma de México.
- Colección las maestras de México: Rita Cetina, Dolores Correa, Laura Méndez, Rosaura Zapata [Collection of the teachers of Mexico: Rita Cetina, Dolores Correa, Laura Méndez, Rosaura Zapata] (in Spanish). México, D.F: Instituto Nacional de Estudios Históricos de las Revoluciones de Mexico. 2015. ISBN 978-607-9419-15-8.
  - Galeana, Patricia. "De madres y esposas y profesionistas emancipadas: las maestras Mexicanas". In Colección las maestras de México (2015).
- González Rey, Diana Crucelly (2014). La educación de las niñas en el Yucatán del Porfiriato, 1870 - 1911 [Girls' education in Yucatan during the Porfiriato, 1870 - 1911.] (Master's thesis) (in Spanish). Centro de Investigaciones y Estudios Superiores en Antropología Social.
- "La Siempreviva finalmente es reconocida en Yucatán a 152 años de su fundación" [La Siempreviva is finally recognized in Yucatán 152 years after its founding.]. Proyecto Libres (in Spanish). 7 May 2022.
- Lavrin, Asunción (1978). Latin American women: historical perspectives. Westport: Greenwood Press. ISBN 978-0-313-20309-1.
- Menéndez de la Peña, Rodolfo (2011) [1909]. Rita Cetina Gutiérrez: 1846-1908 (in Spanish). Mérida: Ilustres Maestros de Yucatán, Casa de la Historia de la Educación de Yucatán. OCLC 1457926311.
- Peniche Rivero, Piedad (2015). Rita Cetina, La Siempreviva y el Instituto Literario de Niñas [Rita Cetina, The Siempreviva and the Girls' Literary Institute] (in Spanish). México City: Instituto Nacional de Estudios Históricos de las Revoluciones de México. ISBN 978-607-9419-47-9. OCLC 952578746.
- Romano, Yolanda; Velázquez García, Sara, eds. (2018). Las inéditas: voces femeninas más allá del silencio [The unpublished: female voices beyond silence] (in Spanish). Salamanca: Ediciones Universidad de Salamanca. ISBN 978-84-9012-887-9.
  - López Ramírez, Claudia Adriana. "Rita Cetina Gutiérrez, una Esctitora "Inédita" del México Decimonónico". In Romano & Velázquez García (2018).
- Rosado Rosado, Georgina; Rosado Avilés, Celia; Canto Alococer, Alicia, eds. (2016). Las hijas de Eva: las semillas de una revolución [Eve's daughters: the seeds of a revolution] (in Spanish). Mérida, Yucatán, México: Universidad Autónoma de Yucatán. ISBN 978-607-9405-65-6.
  - López Ramírez, Claudia Adriana. "Lo femenino en "Julia" la novela corta de Rita Cetina Gutiérrez". In Rosado Rosado, Rosado Avilés & Canto Alococer (2016).
- Salgado Velázquez, Denisse Romina (2017). La Siempreviva (1870-1872), primera publicación periódica redactada y editada por mujeres en México: un estudio desde la óptica del feminismo relacional [La Siempreviva (1870-1872), the first periodical publication written and edited by women in Mexico: a study from the perspective of relational feminism] (Bachelor's thesis) (in Spanish). Universidad Nacional Autónoma de México.
