= Akil Municipality =

Municipality in the Mexican state of Yucatán

Akil
- Municipality
- Region 7 Sur #003

- Location of the Municipality in Mexico
- Coordinates: 20°15′56″N 89°20′52″W
- Country: Mexico
- State: Yucatán
- Mexico Ind.: 1821
- Yucatán Est.: 1824

Government
  - Type: 2012–2015
  - Municipal President: Julian Javier Nic Navarrete

Area
  - Total: 48.54 km^{2} (18.74 sq mi)
- Elevation: 31 m (102 ft)

Population (2010)
  - Total: 10,362
  - Density: 213.5/km^{2} (552.9/sq mi)
  - Demonym: Umanense
- Time zone: UTC-6 (Central Standard Time)
- INEGI Code: 003
- Major Airport: Merida (Manuel Crescencio Rejón) International Airport
- IATA Code: MID
- ICAO Code: MMMD

Akil Municipality (Yucatec Maya: "place of the vines") is a municipality in the Mexican state of Yucatán containing 48.54 km^{2} of land and is located roughly 100 kilometres (62 mi) southeast of the Capital State.

== History ==
There is no accurate data on when the town was founded, but it was a settlement before the conquest. Yucatán declared its independence from the Spanish Crown in 1821, and in 1825 the area was assigned to the High Sierra partition with headquarters in Tekax Municipality. In 1848, one of the bloodiest battles of the Caste War of Yucatán occurred in Akil between Maya rebels and troops under the command of Colonel José Dolores Cetina.

In 1919, it became its own municipality.

== Governance ==
The municipal president is elected for a three-year term. The town council has seven councilpersons, who serve as Secretary and councilors of public works, public lighting, health, public security, public monuments, and nomenclature.

== Communities ==
The head of the municipality is Akil, Yucatán. The municipality has 9 populated places besides the seat including Plan Chác, el Rancho Kitinché, San Diego and San Martino. The significant populations are shown below:

Community	Population
Entire Municipality (2010)	10,362
Akil	9601 in 2005
San Diego	9601 in 2005

== Local festivals ==
Every year in the second week of April there is a festival in honor of Santa Inés.

== Tourist attractions ==
- Church of Santa Inés, built during the sixteenth century
- Archaeological site at Akil
- Archaeological site at Sac nicte Akil
