= Akil, Yucatán =

Town in the Mexican state of Yucatán

Akil
- Municipal Seat
- Location within Yucatán (state)
- Coordinates: 20°15′56″N 89°20′52″W
- Country: Mexico
- State: Yucatán
- Municipality: Akil
- Elevation: 7 m (23 ft)

Population (2010)
  - Total: 10,176
- Time zone: UTC-6 (Central Standard Time)
- Postal code (of seat): 97990
- Area code: 997
- INEGI code: 310030001

Akil is a town and the municipal seat of the Akil Municipality, Yucatán in Mexico. As of 2010, the town has a population of 10,176.
