= Cristina Farfán =

Mexican educator and writer

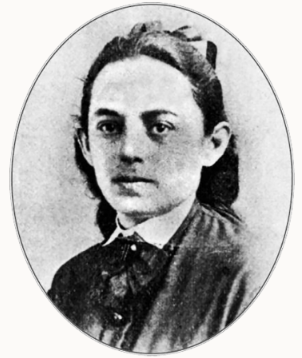
- Born: María Cristina Farfán Manzanilla; 24 July 1846; Mérida, Yucatán, Mexico
- Died: 22 August 1880 (aged 34); San Juan Bautista de la Villa Hermosa, Tabasco, Mexico
- Other name: Cristina Farfán de García Montero
- Occupations: educator, writer, feminist
- Children: 1

Cristina Farfán (24 July 1846 – 22 August 1880) was a Mexican educator and writer who promoted women's education. She was involved in the emergence of the first wave feminist movement in Mexico and was one of the founders of women's literary journalism in Mexico.

== Early life ==
María Cristina Farfán Manzanilla was born on 24 July 1846 in Mérida, Yucatán, Mexico to Candelaria Manzanilla and José María Farfán. She was raised in a strict environment and educated at home by the lawyer and teacher, José María Jesús Apolinario García Montero, typically known as José García Montero.

== Career ==
With the help of García Montero, she secured a post as a teacher at the Colegio La Encarnación. On 3 May 1870, along with Gertrudis Tenorio Zavala and Rita Cetina Gutiérrez, Farfán founded La Siempreviva (The Everlasting), an organization which encompassed Mexico's first secular school for girls as well as an art college for young women; a scientific and literary society; and a newspaper, specifically written by and for women. Though careful not to present an anti-clerical image, the teachers at the school, which was directed by Cetina, based their curricula in science and rationalism, arguing that women were capable of working and intellectual thought. Farfán, Cetina and Tenorio were the first group to publicly promote educating women in Yucatán.

The journal emphasized feminist writings and exposed many Mexican women to European feminism for the first time, and was published by the Palacio del Gobernador (the gubernatorial palace). Besides editing the magazine, the three friends published poems, dedicated to the improvement of women and their education. Farfán's first published work was La Aurora, a compilation of the works of Cetina, Tenorio and herself, which appeared in 1870. Throughout the period from 1870 to 1872, Farfán's works appeared in the journal La Siempreviva and in 1874, she published a collection of essays and poems, La Primavera.

On 1 July 1877, Farfán married her previous instructor García Montero in Mérida and moved with him to Tabasco. In 1879, she founded and became director and editor-in-chief of the journal El Recreo del Hogar (Recreating the Home) in Tabasco, collaborating with other feminists, such as Dolores Correa Zapata. In 1880, she founded the school, Colegio del Porvenir (College of the Future). Both the journal and the school were based on the scientific themes she had previously implemented in Mérida.

== Death and legacy ==
Farfán died in childbirth on the morning of 22 August 1880 after traveling by train arriving in San Juan Bautista de la Villa Hermosa, Tabasco, Mexico from Mexico City. Her newborn daughter died shortly thereafter. A funeral booklet, by some of the most noted authors of the period was written to commemorate Farfán's contributions as a pioneer educator and literary journalist. Three years after her death, the journal El Dominguero bestowed upon her the title of "Misionera de la Civilización" (Missionary of Civilization) to recognize how her literary contributions had changed societal perception and opportunities for women. In 1885, her husband removed her remains from Tabasco and reburied them in his family crypt in her home town of Mérida. The re-interment ceremony was widely attended by dignitaries, friends, and colleagues.

== Selected works ==
- Farfán, Cristina; Tenorio Zavala, Gertrudis; Cetina Gutiérrez, Rita (1870). Estrada y Zenea, Ildefonso (ed.). La Aurora (PDF) (in Spanish). Mérida, Mexico: "El Iris" de Ildefonso Estrada y Zenea. Archived from the original (PDF) on 5 December 2017.
- 1870–1872 various poems in the journal La Siempreviva
- 1874 La Primavera: Poesía y ensayo
- Farfán, Cristina (1893). "Cristina Farfán de García Montero". In Vigil, José María (ed.). Poetisas mexicanas. Siglos XVI, XVII, XVIII y XIX (PDF) (in Spanish). Mexico City, Mexico: Secr. De Fomento. pp. 217–219. Archived from the original (PDF) on 3 April 2016.
