= Elvia Carrillo Puerto =

Mexican politician and feminist (1881–1965)

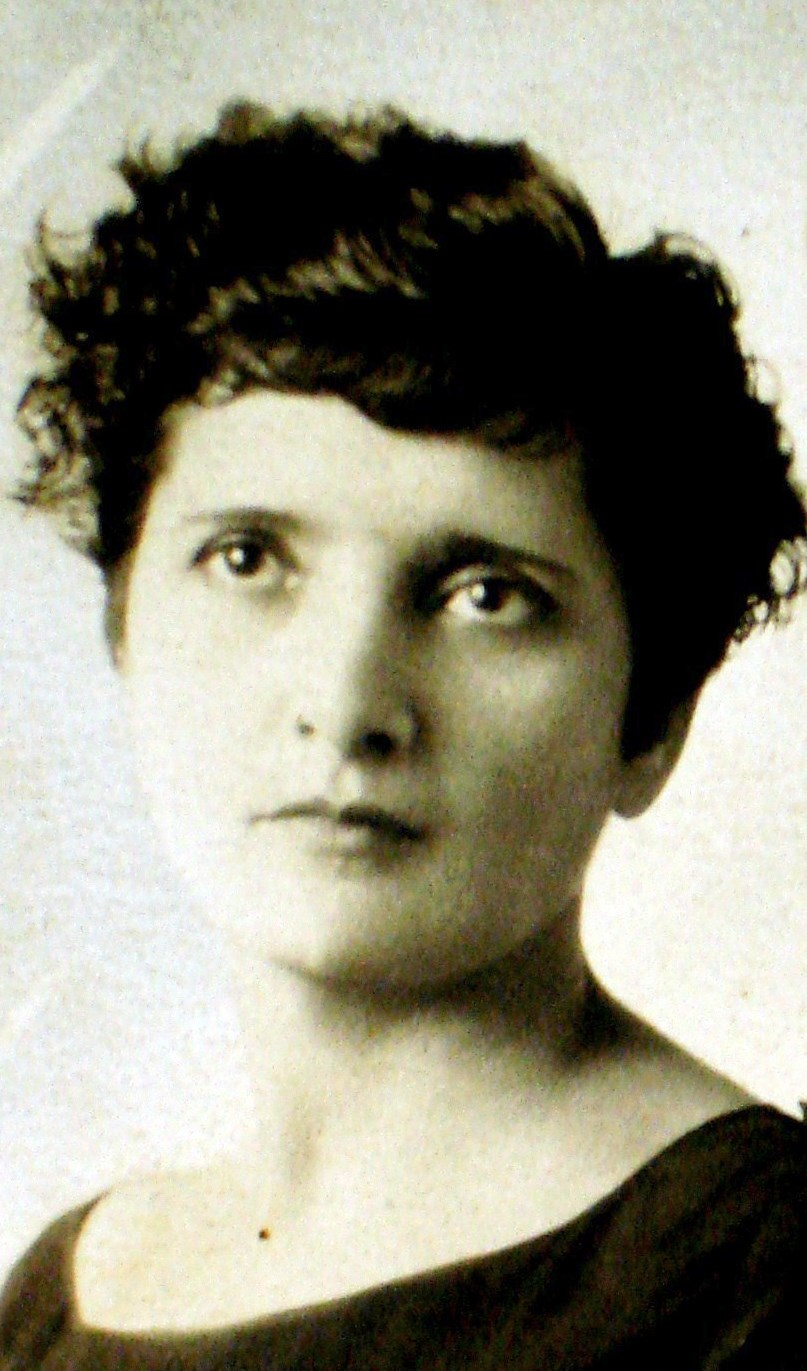
- Elvia Carrillo Puerto, 1901
- Born: 30 January 1881; Motul, Yucatán, Mexico
- Died: 18 April 1965 (aged 84); Mexico City, Mexico
- Occupations: Activist, politician
- Relatives: Felipe Carrillo Puerto (brother)

Elvia Carrillo Puerto (30 January 1881 – 18 April 1965) was a Mexican socialist politician and feminist activist. She is known for her work with various feminist organizations and for her attempts to run for office in Yucatán and San Luis Potosí. Some refer to her as "The Red Nun of the Mayab". (Note: Mayab is a Mayan-language term for the Yucatán Peninsula.)

Carrillo was born to a middle-class family in Motul, Yucatán. She became politically active by 1910, when she served as a courier and spy in the Valladolid Rebellion against dictator Porfirio Díaz and his favored candidate in the 1909 Yucatán gubernatorial election, Enrique Muñoz Arístegui. She founded the Rita Cetina Gutiérrez Feminst League in 1919, which advocated for birth control and literacy for rural women. In 1923, she was elected to the Yucatán legislature but fled during political unrest following the assassination of her brother, Yucatán Governor Felipe Carrillo Puerto. She also campaigned to become a deputy in San Luis Potosí's fourth district. Despite winning the popular vote, her victory was overturned on the grounds that women were ineligible for office.

In the late 1920s and 1930s, Carrillo advocated for women's suffrage and labor rights by organizing national conferences and working with feminist organizations such as the Sole Front for Women's Rights (Spanish: Frente Único Pro Derechos de la Mujer, FUPDM). However, she experienced financial hardship later in life and ultimately died of bronchopneumonia in Mexico City in 1965. The Mexican Senate established the Elvia Carrillo Puerto medal in 2013 to honor women advocating for gender equality and women's rights, and she has been commemorated with several statues. She is recognized for her pivotal role in advancing women's rights and women's suffrage in Mexico.

== Early life ==
Elvia Carrillo Puerto was born in Motul, Yucatán, on 30 January 1881, to Justiniano Carrillo and Adela Puerto. (Note: According to her official biography published online by the Senate of the Republic, she was born on 6 December 1878. However, according to both Sauri and Cuéllar Montero, she was born on 30 January 1881. Peniche Rivero also states that she was born in 1881, but does not specify a date. Sauri attributes these discrepancies to inaccurate dating introduced by Monique Lemaitre in her book Elvia Carrillo Puerto: La Monja Roja del Mayab (transl. 'Elvia Carrillo Puerto. The Red Nun of the Mayab').) She was the sixth of 14 children. Her family was middle class, with her father working as the owner of a hardware store and as a political operative for Francisco Cantón, a politician who had served as a commander in the Caste War of Yucatán. Both Justiniano and Adela spoke a Mayan language, which Elvia learned to speak as well. While little is known about Elvia's education, she did complete elementary school, and some sources state that she was educated by a Catalan anarchist priest named Serafín García. She allegedly learned to play violin at García's home, and was also introduced to works by feminist and socialist authors in his library. Some (Note: Specifically, López Ramírez, Peniche Rivera, and former Yucatecan Secretary of Education Raúl Godoy Montañez in the prologue to Menéndez's biography of Cetina all identify Carrillo as a student of Cetina's. Infante Vargas, however, says that this may be an assumption.) also state that she was a student of Mexican educator Rita Cetina Gutiérrez, co-founder of the La Siempreviva (transl. 'Liveforever') school and literary society. In 1900, at the age of 19, Carrillo married Vicente Pérez Mendiburu, a 28-year-old merchant. (Note: Peniche Rivero states that the marriage took place when she was 13 and that Pérez was a teacher. However, Sauri Riancho and states that she was 19, and Cuéllar Montero states that the marriage took place in 1900, which would have made her 19. Both also state that Pérez was a merchant. Sauri Riancho also attributes this discrepancy to Lemaitre's work, positing that the civil marriage certificate between Carrillo and Pérez shows that Carrillo was 19 and lists Pérez's occupation as "merchant".) The couple had two children: Marcial and Gloria, the latter of whom died shortly after birth.

Between 1909 and 1910, Carrillo became involved in opposition to dictator Porfirio Díaz's regime. Díaz's regime, which lasted for over three decades, was marked by industrialization and modernization, as well as economic inequality, intensified policing, increased government surveillance, and an enlarged prison system. Throughout the 1900s, political reformer Francisco I. Madero opposed the Díaz regime. In Yucatán, Madero's adherents, the Maderistas, and an anti-Díaz faction called the Independent Electoral Center challenged Díaz's candidate, Enrique Muñoz Arístegui, in the 1909 gubernatorial elections, leading to the arrest of many opposition leaders. As a result, the opposition devised the Plan of Dzelkoop, which called for an uprising in Valladolid, Yucatán. Carrillo participated in this uprising, called the Valladolid Rebellion, acting as a courier and spy for the insurrectionists. All of their correspondences in the leadup to the uprising were routed through her father's hardware store under her name and distributed to their intended recipients. The uprising ultimately took place on 4 June 1910, with 1,500 participating in total. It was suppressed by a federal battalion from Veracruz.

== Early feminist activism ==
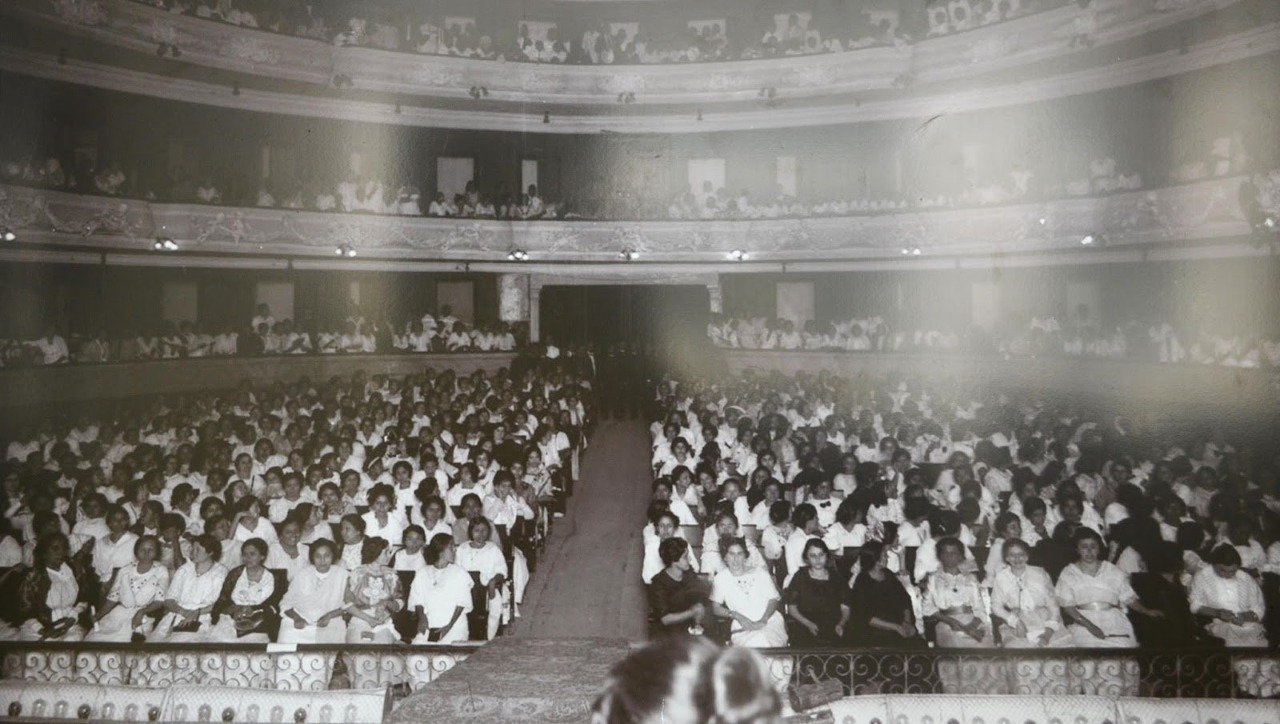
First Feminist Congress of Yucatán, January 1916

Some sources state that Carrillo organized the first Peasant Feminist League in 1912. However, biographer Dulce María Sauri Riancho argues that this is "premature" and that this claim lacks documentary evidence. Her husband also initiated divorce proceedings against her in 1912, allegedly due to "long-standing differences". (Note: Peniche Rivero states that she was "widowed". However, both Sauri and Cuéllar Montero state that she was divorced.) Reformer Salvador Alvarado became governor of Yucatán in 1915, introducing several reforms aimed at increasing women's social autonomy. In January 1916, it is likely that Carrillo attended the Alvarado-sponsored First Feminist Congress of Yucatán alongside Hermila Galindo, Raquel Dzib Cicero, and Rosa Torre González. (Note: Many sources state that she attended, including Godoy Montañez, Peniche Rivera, Alejandre Ramírez and Torres Alonso, López Ramírez, Cuéllar Montero. However, while Sauri acknowledges that it is "very likely" that Carrillo participated, she also posits that this claim lacks documentary evidence, and that she probably was not one of the primary organizers of the event.) In total, over 600 women attended the congress, discussing various topics including women's education, labor, and leadership. She did attend the second Feminist Congress in December 1916, where she advocated for women's suffrage. Later, in 1917, she married Francisco Barroso, a public servant from Motul. In 1919, she established the Rita Cetina Gutiérrez Feminist League, which advocated for various reforms, including birth control, drawing the antipathy of the Catholic Church. Yucatecan socialists, including Carrillo, also faced persecution under the presidency of Venustiano Carranza, with the offices of the Socialist Party of Yucatán being raided, prompting Carrillo to temporarily relocate to Mexico City for over a year beginning in November 1919.

Throughout the early 1920s, feminist leagues spread throughout Yucatán, with most being dominated by the Rita Cetina Gutiérrez Feminist League. Carrillo's brother, Felipe Carrillo Puerto, who was the president of the Socialist Party of the Southeast (Spanish: Partido Socialista del Sureste, PSS), gained political influence through the establishment of his own resistance leagues, eventually becoming the governor of Yucatán in 1922. As part of her work with the Rita Cetina Gutiérrez Feminist League, Carrillo coordinated a literacy drive for rural women, offering a $50 reward to educators who successfully taught twenty or more girls to read within three months. She also established a library for the league's female members, securing over 150 books from Secretary of Public Education José Vasconcelos during a May 1922 visit to Mexico City. She divorced Barroso in 1922, but she remarried him six months later.

== Political career ==
In 1923, Carrillo was nominated as the PSS candidate for Yucatán's fifth local district. In the November elections, she won by 5,115 votes, a significant majority, making her one of the three women to be elected to the Congress of Yucatán that year, alongside Raquel Dzib Cicero and Beatriz Peniche Barrera. However, after her brother Felipe endorsed Plutarco Elías Calles—viewed by some as being too left-leaning—for president, he was targeted by supporters of Adolfo de la Huerta, Calles's rival. De la Huerta's supporters, who called themselves the anti-imposicionistas (transl. 'anti-impositionists'), initiated an armed rebellion in December 1923, prompting Felipe to attempt to flee the state. He was captured on 21 December and executed by an anti-imposicionista contingent on 3 January 1924. Elvia also fled Yucatán during this period, disguised as a man. The PSS regained control of the state in April 1924, but the elected female legislators were not reinstated. The feminist leagues were also dissolved. In 1925, Carrillo's marriage to Barroso ended in a second divorce. Subsequently, she relocated to the state of San Luis Potosí.

In 1925, Carrillo began her campaign to become a deputy in San Luis Potosí's fourth district. Her campaign was supported by the state's governor, Aurelio Manrique, as well as Calles, who had become president in 1924, and Adalberto Tejeda Olivares, Calles's Secretary of the Interior. She selected a woman, Hermila Zamarrón, as her alternate (Note: Candidates for the Mexican Chamber of Deputies run alongside alternates who will replace them if they are unable to complete their term.) against the advice of local liberal politicians, who believed that it would be "impossible" to find a woman in the state who was neither a Catholic nor a "reactionary". However, Manrique was removed from office in November 1925. According to academic Graciela Yolanda Estrada Alcorta, this was because of "radical socialist reforms" he pursued, which she alleges led to labor unrest, unemployment, and opposition from the ASARCO mining company, which had significant investments in the state. His replacement, Abel Cano, was strongly opposed to Carrillo's candidacy. He took various measures to obstruct her campaign, and near its end, her opponent's alternate attempted to assassinate her. Despite this, she won the popular vote by 4,576. However, the Federal Electoral College ruled that Carrillo's candidacy was invalid because women were ineligible for office, thereby officially confirming her opponent's election. With no legal recourse to challenge the college's decision, she abandoned her candidacy and moved to Mexico City. In 1926, Carrillo presented a petition to the Congress of the Union to amend Article 34 of the Constitution of Mexico. Article 34 was written using the grammatical masculine gender, which meant that only men explicitly had a right to participate in the electoral process. The petition received thousands of signatures.

== Sole Front for Women's Rights ==
As of 1931, Carrillo was an employee of the Secretariat of Agriculture and Development. Politically, she aligned herself with the National Revolutionary Party (Spanish: Partido Nacional Revolucionario, PNR) and was a member of the party's Women's Action Guiding League, which advocated for women's labor rights and suffrage. She also helped to organize three national congresses of working-class and peasant women: one in 1931, one in 1933, and one in 1934. The 1934 congress, with guidance from Carrillo and María del Refugio García, led to the establishment of the Sole Front for Women's Rights (Spanish: Frente Único Pro Derechos de la Mujer, FUPDM), which united numerous women's groups (Note: 25 according to Peniche Rivero and 30 according to Sauri.) into a single organization with over 50,000 members.

The FUPDM was the dominant feminist organization during the late 1930s in Mexico, and its platform called for wage increases for women, the establishment of maternity homes, and women's suffrage. Furthermore, beyond gender-specific reforms, the FUPDM also called for agrarian redistribution, the implementation of an eight-hour workday, price reductions for essential goods, and increased welfare spending. Some sectors of the FUDPM such as the Women's Revolutionary Institute, where Carrillo served as secretary as of 1938, differentiated themselves by distinguishing gender- from class-based oppression. The relationship between class- and gender-based oppression had been a topic of considerable debate at the three national congresses.

Carrillo was employed as a statistician at the Secretariat of Economy, but was terminated from her position in January 1938. Meanwhile, her son was also dismissed from his position as a stamp inspector in Sonora. That February, President Lázaro Cárdenas proposed that the women of the FUPDM be integrated into the newly renamed Party of the Mexican Revolution (Spanish: Partido de la Revolución Mexicana, PRM, formerly the PNR) as a "vital sector". Carrillo signed a document agreeing to this proposal in her capacity as the secretary of the Women's Revolutionary Institute. This led to the fragmentation of the FUPDM into smaller interest groups for workers, peasants, the military, and other sectors. Some FUPDM members criticized the move, with Adelina Zendejas arguing that "the way to control women was to incorporate them into each sector", with women's leaders advocating "only for those in their little chapel".

== Later life ==
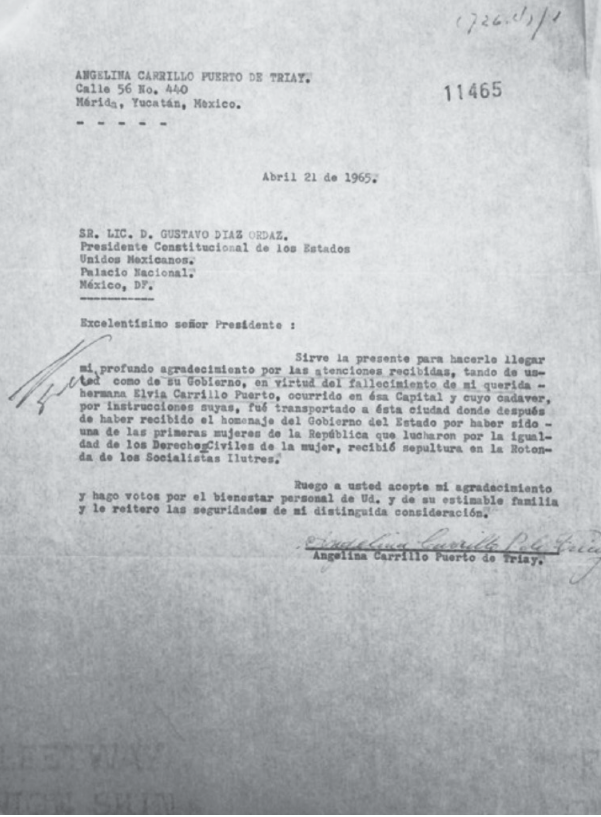
Letter written by Adelina Carrillo, Elvia's sister, requesting the support of President Gustavo Díaz Ordaz in transferring her remains to Yucatán, her place of birth

After being terminated from her position at the Secretariat of Economy, Carrillo struggled financially. In both 1938 and 1939, she wrote to Cárdenas describing her financial difficulties. At a subsequent audience, Cárdenas agreed to restore her and her son to their previous positions but failed to actually do so. To support herself during this time, she provided music lessons and other private classes, supplementing her income with financial assistance from friends. However, her financial difficulties were further exacerbated by a traffic collision in 1941, which left her nearly blind. After the accident, she asked for and received financial assistance from Manuel Ávila Camacho, who had become president in 1940.

In 1952, the Mexican government accorded Carrillo a "Revolutionary Merit" award in recognition of her work with working-class and peasant women. In 1953, under the administration of Adolfo Ruiz Cortines, Mexico's constitution was amended to give women the right to vote and run for office. Carrillo gave a speech before the Chamber of Deputies celebrating the amendment. However, she continued to struggle financially for the remainder of her life, sustaining herself by giving music lessons. According to her niece, she lived in a small apartment in the center of Mexico City. She died on 18 April 1965 (Note: According to her official biography published online by the Senate, she died on 15 April 1968. Meanwhile, Peniche Rivero states that she died in 1967 without specifying a date. However, both Sauri and Cuéllar Montero state that she died in 1965, Sauri on 18 April. Sauri quotes from several contemporary news stories published in 1965 to support her claim and includes a picture of a letter dated 21 April 1965 in which Adelina Carrillo, Elvia's sister, requests the support of President Gustavo Díaz Ordaz in transferring Elvia's remains to Yucatán.) in Mexico City of bronchopneumonia. Her remains were interred at the Rotunda of the Illustrious Socialists in the General Cemetery of Mérida, Yucatán, alongside those of her brother Felipe.

== Legacy ==
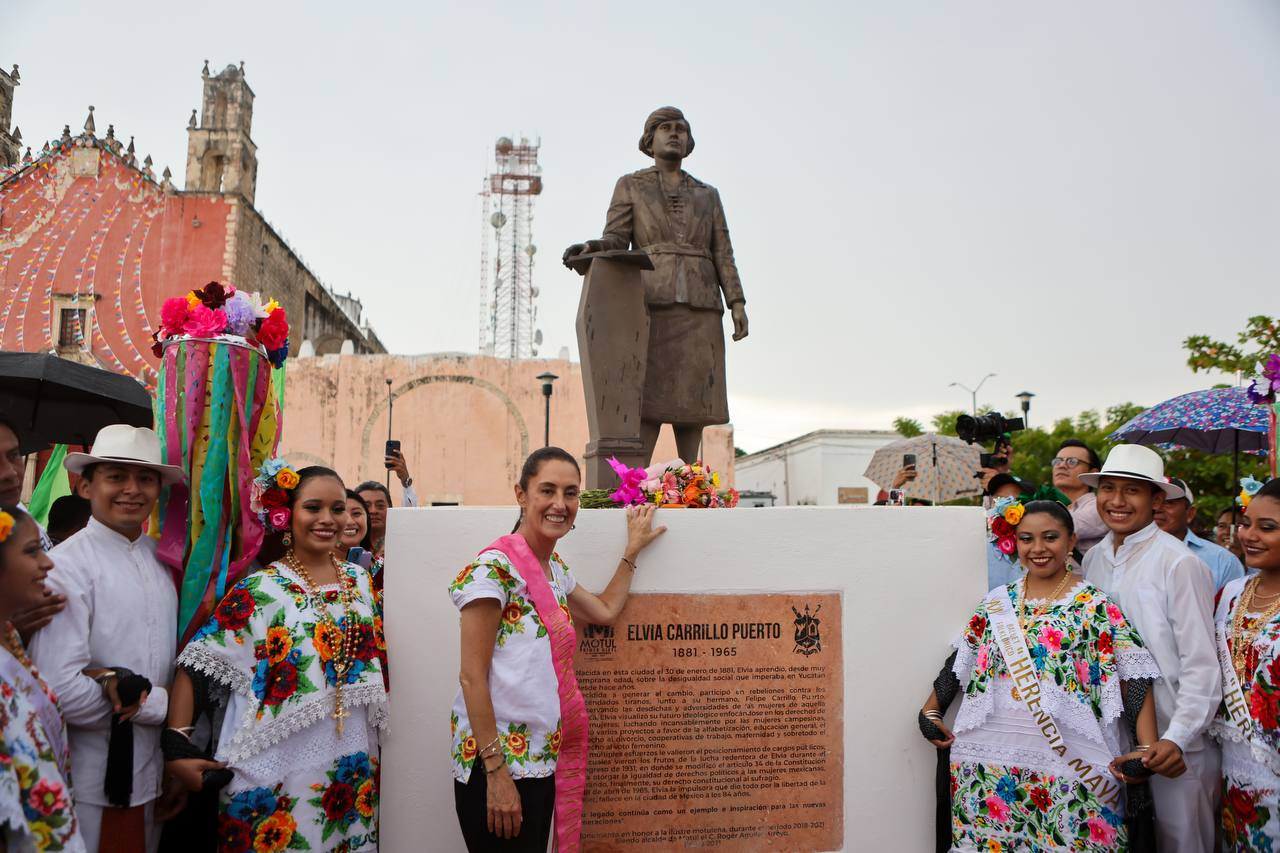
Claudia Sheinbaum, Mexico's first female president, visiting a statue of Carrillo in Motul, Yucatán

The Senate of Mexico established the Elvia Carrillo Puerto medal in 2013 in Carrillo's honor. The medal is awarded every 8 March to women who have distinguished themselves for their work in the "defense, protection, exercise, and/or investigation of women's human rights and gender equality in [Mexico]". In 2017, she was the subject of a Google Doodle. A statue of Carrillo was erected in Motul in 2020. She was also one of twelve women to be honored with a sculpture at the Paseo de las Heroínas in Mexico City. In 2021, her name was inscribed on the Wall of Honor at the Legislative Palace of San Lázaro.

Several scholars, including Juan Ricardo Cuéllar Montero, have noted Carrillo's contributions to women's rights in Mexico, with historian Piedad Peniche Rivero arguing that Carrillo was one of the "most consistent" advocates for women's suffrage after the Mexican Revolution because of her belief that women's participation in electoral processes would lead to "the socialization of marriage", as well as "the end of double standards and the male monopoly on political and economic power". Meanwhile, Sauri argues that Carrillo faced various forms of political violence but was able to transcend the "social and familial forces" affecting contemporary women through personal resilience.

== Sources ==
- Alejandre Ramírez, Gloria Luz; Torres Alonso, Eduardo (2016). "El Primer Congreso Feminista de Yucatán 1916. El camino a la legislación del sufragio y reconocimiento de ciudadanía a las mujeres. Construcción y tropiezos" [The First Feminist Congress of Yucatan 1916. The road to suffrage legislation and recognition of women citizenship. Construction and stumbles]. Estudios políticos (in Spanish). 39: 60–89.
- Beezley, William H.; MacLachlan, Colin M. (2009). Mexicans in Revolution, 1910-1946: An Introduction. Lincoln: The University of Nebraska Press. ISBN 978-0-8032-2447-6.
- Cano, Gabriela (1991). "Las feministas en campaña: la primera mitad del siglo XX" [Campaigning feminists: the first half of the 20th century]. Debate Feminista (in Spanish). 4: 269–292. doi:10.22201/cieg.2594066xe.1991.4.1536 (inactive 1 July 2025).
- Cano, Gabriela (2019). "Mexico: The Long Road to Women's Suffrage". In Franceschet, Susan; Krook, Mona Lena; Tan, Netina (eds.). The Palgrave Handbook of Women's Political Rights. London: Palgrave Macmillan. pp. 115–128. doi:10.1057/978-1-137-59074-9_8. ISBN 978-1-137-59073-2.
- Carey, James C. (1984). The Mexican Revolution in Yucatán, 1915-1924. Boulder: Westview Press. ISBN 0-86531-877-8.
- Cuéllar Montero, Juan Ricardo (2023). "Igualdad y participación política de las mujeres: Elvia Carrillo Puerto" [Equality and political participation of women: Elvia Carrillo Puerto]. Instituto Nacional de Estudios Históricos de las Revoluciones de México (in Spanish).
- Estrada Alcorta, Graciela Yolanda (2011). Contextos, actores y procesos en la construcción de la Facultad de Humanidades en la Universidad Autónoma de San Luis Potosí [Contexts, actors and processes in the construction of the Faculty of Humanities at the Autonomous University of San Luis Potosí] (PDF) (Master's thesis) (in Spanish). San Luis Potosí: El Colegio de San Luis.
- Infante Vargas, Lucrecia (2015). "Rita Cetina Gutiérrez: Primera Mentora Yucateca (1846–1908)" [Rita Cetina Gutiérrez: First Yucatecan Mentor (1846–1908)]. Colección las maestras de México: Rita Cetina, Dolores Correa, Laura Méndez, Rosaura Zapata [Collection of the teachers of Mexico: Rita Cetina, Dolores Correa, Laura Méndez, Rosaura Zapata] (in Spanish). Mexico City: Instituto Nacional de Estudios Históricos de las Revoluciones de Mexico. pp. 21–46. ISBN 978-607-9419-15-8.
- Loaeza, Soledad (2013). "La Reforma Política de Manuel Ávila Camacho" [The Political Reform of Manuel Ávila Camacho]. Historia Mexicana (in Spanish). 63 (1): 251–358. JSTOR 23608662.
- López Ramírez, Claudia Adriana (2018). "Rita Cetina Gutiérrez, una Esctitora "Inédita" del México Decimonónico" [Rita Cetina Gutiérrez, an "Unpublished" Writer of Nineteenth-Century Mexico]. In Romano, Yolanda; Velázquez García, Sara (eds.). Las inéditas: voces femeninas más allá del silencio [The unpublished: female voices beyond silence] (in Spanish). Salamanca: Ediciones Universidad de Salamanca. pp. 553–565. ISBN 978-84-9012-887-9.
- Macías, Anna (1978). "Felipe Carrillo Puerto and women's liberation in Mexico". In Lavrin, Asunción (ed.). Latin American Women: Historical Perspectives. Westport: Greenwood. pp. 286–301. ISBN 0-313-20309-1.
- Menéndez de la Peña, Rodolfo (2011) [1909]. Rita Cetina Gutiérrez: 1846-1908 (in Spanish). Mérida: Ilustres Maestros de Yucatán, Casa de la Historia de la Educación de Yucatán. OCLC 1457926311.
- Peniche Rivero, Piedad (2011). "Elvia Carrillo Puerto, su vida, sus tiempos y sus relaciones peligrosas con los caudillos de la Revolución Mexicana" [Elvia Carrillo Puerto, her life, her times, and her dangerous relationships with the leaders of the Mexican Revolution]. Boletín del Archivo General de la Nación (in Spanish). 7 (9): 85–104.
- Peniche Rivero, Piedad (2015). Rita Cetina, La Siempreviva y el Instituto Literario de Niñas [Rita Cetina, The Siempreviva and the Girls' Literary Institute] (in Spanish). México City: Instituto Nacional de Estudios Históricos de las Revoluciones de México. ISBN 978-607-9419-47-9. OCLC 952578746.
- Pigott, Charles Maurice (2024). "Indigenous Poiesis: The Semiotics of Circulation in Villegas' Maya Poetry". In Fiedorczuk, Julia; Newell, Mary; Quetchenbach, Bernard; Tierney, Orchid (eds.). The Routledge Companion to Ecopoetics. New York: Routledge. pp. 57–66. ISBN 978-1-003-18702-8.
- Ross, Stanley R. (2019). Francisco I. Madero: Apostle of Mexican Democracy. New York: Columbia University Press. ISBN 9780231882613.
- Sauri Riancho, Dulce María (2021). Elvia Carrillo Puerto: Violencia política y resiliencia [Elvia Carrillo Puerto: Political Violence and Resilience] (PDF) (in Spanish). Mexico City: Cámara de Diputados. ISBN 978-607-8812-10-3.
- Smith, Stephanie J. (2009). Gender and the Mexican Revolution: Yucatán Women and the Realities of Patriarchy. Chapel Hill: The University of North Carolina Press. ISBN 978-0-8078-3284-4.
- Tuñón Pablos, Esperanza (2011). "El Frente Único pro Derechos de la Mujer Durante el Cardenismo" [The Sole Front for Women's Rights During the Cardenista Period]. In Espinosa Damián, Gisela; Jaiven, Ana Lau (eds.). Un fantasma recorre el siglo: Luchas feministas en México 1910-2010 [A ghost haunts the century: feminist struggles in Mexico 1910-2010] (in Spanish). Mexico City: Universidad Autónoma Metropolitana. pp. 95–124. ISBN 978-607-7957-14-0.
