= Rosa Torre González =

First woman in elected office in Mexico

- Born: 30 August 1890; Mérida, Yucatán, Mexico
- Died: 13 February 1973 (aged 82); Mexico City, Mexico
- Occupations: educator, feminist, activist
- Known for: 1st woman to hold elective office in Mexico

María Rosa Torre González (30 August 1890 – 13 February 1973) was born in the state of Yucatán, Mexico. She was the first woman in Mexico to hold an elected office.

== Early life ==
María Rosa Torre González was born on August 30, 1890, in Mérida, Yucatán, Mexico to Sofía Torre. Her grandparents were Paula González and Gregorio Torre, whose surnames she used to conceal being an illegitimate child. She attended the Girls' Literary Institute operated by Rita Cetina Gutiérrez, an innovative teacher who rejected teaching girls only domestic skills, instead teaching feminist theory in a curriculum also including astronomy, constitutional law, geometry, geography, history, and mathematics.

== Career ==
In 1910, Torre began working at the girls' neighborhood school in the colonia of Santa Ana. After four years, she transferred to the kindergarten attached to the normal school and worked there until 1917.

At the age of 14, in 1910, Torre joined the supporters of Francisco I. Madero as a propagandist. With Madero's assassination, Torre became involved in espionage against the coup leader Victoriano Huerta in 1913. When Venustiano Carranza secured Huerta's agreement to step down and sent Salvador Alvarado to quell the rebellion in Yucatán, Torre served as a nurse with Alvarado's troops. By March, 1915, Alvarado's troops had taken the city of Mérida and Torre entered the state Normal School.

In 1916, as part of his socialist regime, Alvarado called for a feminist congress to be convened. Torre served as a promoter for the gathering, traveling to Acanceh, Temax and Motul to boost the attendance of qualified women. In January 1916 the Primer Congreso Feminista (First Feminist Congress) was held and topics discussed were education, including sex education; religious fanaticism; legal rights and reforms; equal employment opportunity; and intellectual equality, among others. At the Second Congress, held later that same year, Torre served as President.

Torre assisted Elvia Carrillo Puerto in establishing the Liga Rita Cetina Gutierrez (League of Rita Cetina Gutiérrez) in 1919. The group "campaigned against prostitution, drugs, alcohol and superstition" and gave educational talks about birth control, child care, economics and hygiene. They also inspected hospitals and schools and helped to found the state orphanage. In coordination with Elvia Carrillo Puerto, Torre set up over 45 feminist leagues over the next few years and organized over 5,500 workers.

In 1922, Governor Felipe Carrillo Puerto urged the legislature of the state of Yucatán to allow women to vote and hold office. Torre ran for a seat on the Mérida city council and won, becoming the first woman in Mexico to hold elective office. Her term was cut short with the assassination of Carrillo Puerto, but Torre was proud of her service and aware that the achievement was a symbol for other women.

Torre attended the Primer Congreso Interamericano de Mujeres (First Inter-American Congress of Women) held on August 27, 1947, in Guatemala City, which had the goal of discussing how to attain equality between men and women and suffrage throughout the Americas. Torre was the delegate of Liga Internacional y People's Mandate of Querétaro and was accompanied by Judith Horcasitas de Forgerave, representing the Civil Service of Mexican Women; Emilia Loyola, representing the teachers of Mexico City; and Elena Sánchez Valenzuela, representing teachers and the Secretary of Education of Coahuila.

== Personal life ==
María Rosa Torre González died alone in Mexico City, on 13 February 1973. She did not have any siblings and never married.
