= Rita Cetina Gutiérrez =

Mexican teacher, poet and feminist (1846–1908)

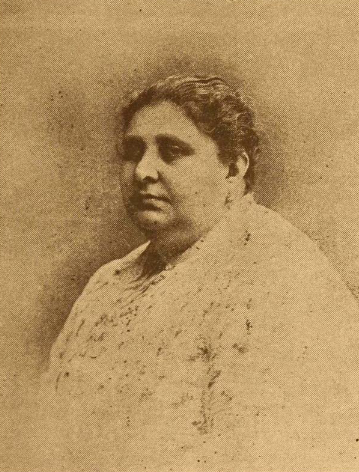
- Rita Cetina Gutiérrez
- Born: Rita Cetina Gutiérrez; 22 May 1846; Mérida, Yucatán, Mexico
- Died: 11 October 1908 (aged 62); Mérida, Yucatán, Mexico
- Other name: Cristobela
- Occupations: Educator, feminist, writer
- Years active: 1870–1902

Signature
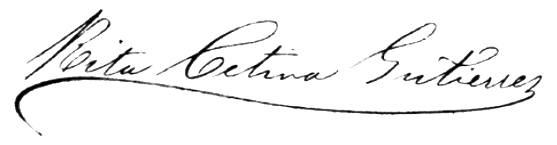

Rita Cetina Gutiérrez (22 May 1846 – 11 October 1908) was a 19th-century Mexican educator, writer, and feminist who promoted women's education in Mérida, Yucatán. She helped found a literary society, a periodical, and a school with Gertrudis Tenorio Zavala and Cristina Farfán. All three were called La Siempreviva (transl. 'Liveforever'). She also taught at and served as director of the La Siempreviva school.

In 1877, Cetina left her position at the La Siempreviva school to serve as director of the Girls' Literary Institute, a public school for girls. Two years later, she returned to the La Siempreviva school. Several years after that, she returned once again to the Institute, where she faced many difficulties, including budget cuts and criticism from the state government for teaching pedagogy and natural science. She eventually retired from teaching due to poor health.

Cetina's literary output included poetry and fiction. Her poetry was published in many local journals and newspapers, sometimes under the pen name "Cristobela". Due to the nationalist themes of many of her poems, she has been called the "cantora de la patria" (transl. 'singer of the homeland'). She also wrote short stories, plays, and a single novel, Julia, which was one of the first novels ever to be published by a Mexican woman.

Cetina is also considered to be one of Mexico's first feminists due to her contributions to women's education and her writing, which called for women's emancipation and enlightenment. After her death in 1908, one of her students, Elvia Carrillo Puerto, helped to found the Rita Cetina Gutiérrez Feminist League.

== Early life ==
Rita Rosaura Cetina Gutiérrez was born on 22 May 1846 in Mérida, Yucatán, Mexico, to Don Pedro Cetina and Doña Jacoba Gutiérrez. She had two brothers and one sister. Her father was a politician, holding office in multiple state administrations. He was assassinated in 1859, when Cetina was 13 or 14. Her mother assumed guardianship of her after her father's death, receiving assistance from a family friend who helped educate the girls. Later, she also received instruction from Cuban professor, philologist, and writer Félix Ramos y Duarte.

== Educational career ==
=== La Siempreviva ===
In 1870, Cetina helped to found the literary society La Siempreviva with the help of Gertrudis Tenorio Zavala and Cristina Farfán. The society's periodical, also called La Siempreviva, began publication on 7 May that year. At the time of La Siempreviva's establishment, patriarchal ideas promoted by the Catholic Church were dominant in Yucatán. Religious morality dictated that a woman's primary value was derived from marriage. To combat this, La Siempreviva published articles discussing women abroad who were beginning to enter the workplace. Women were also sought as contributors, potential owners, and financial beneficiaries of the publication. According to its introduction, it aimed to "make women completely emerge from the slavery of ignorance and enter with slow but firm steps into the sacrosanct temple of truth and science".

A year later, on 3 May 1871, (Note: According to Menéndez, the school "opened on [3 May] 1870," while according to Peniche, "a document in [Cetina's] own handwriting says that it was founded a year later, on 3 May 1871." Peniche argues that the 1871 date is more plausible, claiming that no educational expenses are featured in the society's expenditures for the first year.) La Siempreviva established a school, which, like the society and the periodical, was called La Siempreviva. The first public schools for girls in the region, which offered only elementary education, had been founded in the suburbs of Mérida three years prior in 1968. Before that, the only education girls in Yucatán might receive was from one of the "Amigas" (transl. 'Friends') schools, which taught catechism, sewing, reading, and sometimes writing. La Siempreviva offered girls of various social classes access to higher education. Cetina was president of the school and worked as a teacher alongside her sister Guadalupe and several other women. A number of disciplines were taught at the school, including art, astronomy, geography, history, hygiene, language arts, mathematics, and music.

=== Girls' Literary Institute ===
In 1867, the government of Mexico, having just achieved victory in the Second French intervention in Mexico, began enacting reforms to its education system. Among these reforms was the passage of the Organic Law of Public Instruction, which mandated public schooling for both male and female children. In March 1868, Governor Manuel Cepeda Peraza ordered the creation of the Girls' Literary Institute, a public school that would provide primary and secondary education for girls, but it was not officially established until 16 September 1877, nine years later.

Cetina was named as director of the Institute. As a result, the La Siempreviva school temporarily closed. Alongside other teachers from La Siempreviva, Cetina took an examination before the State Education Council with the assistance of her mentor Ramos, officially becoming a licensed primary and higher education teacher. In addition to her work as director of the Institute, Cetina taught reading, spelling, and grammar. During Cetina's time at the Institute, several students were allowed to board at the school as adjuncts, and scholarships were established for impoverished girls, known as "graced pupils".

Cetina resigned from her position at the Institute on 1 March 1879. The precise reasons are unknown, though biographer Piedad Peniche Rivero offers two possible explanations. The first is that Cetina read a passage from the Bible in class, causing a crisis for the school by contradicting its purportedly secular mission. The second is that Cetina became involved in a dispute with Yucatán Governor Manuel Romero Ancona over funding for the school. In either case, professor Enriqueta Dorchester replaced Cetina after her resignation. (Note: Menéndez favors the latter explanation, stating that Cetina's resignation came about because of "differences of opinion between the State Government and the Director of the Institute." López concurs, stating that "ideological differences between Rita and the State," as well as "budget cuts" led to Cetina's resignation.)

=== Return to La Siempreviva and the Institute ===
After Cetina's resignation from the Institute, she reopened La Siempreviva. Around 80 girls were enrolled in the reopened school, many of whom were previously enrolled at the Institute, and she made efforts to integrate La Siempreviva into the Institute. However, La Siempreviva closed permanently in 1886, when the new Yucatán Governor Guillermo Palomino appointed her to lead the Institute once again.

When Cetina resumed directorship of the Institute, its resources were limited, with "income not sufficient for its maintenance". The budget allotted to the school by the Palomino administration increased initially, but not enough to cover the school's expenses, causing Cetina to request that money be allocated for food and staff. Ultimately, the budget was cut even further, with multiple positions being eliminated, salaries being cut, and food allocations for the sick being eliminated. The next year, music, figure drawing, and French classes were cut. A measles epidemic also led to a shortage of teachers during the 1899 academic year. Cetina made various proposals to the government to address these problems, but none were accepted.

Cetina and the Institute clashed with the administration of Governor Francisco Cantón Rosado over the teaching of pedagogy and natural science. These classes were removed from and reinstated to the curriculum multiple times between 1900 and 1901. Cetina ultimately retired from the Institute in 1902 due to poor health. The struggle to teach these classes continued after her retirement.

== Literary activity ==
=== Poetry ===
Cetina began participating in poetry competitions in 1862. In 1863, several of her poems were published in the newspaper La Esparanza (transl. 'Hope') under the pseudonym "Cristobela". Then, in 1866, she performed a public recitation of a poem she wrote about Yucateco soldiers returning to Mérida after the Siege of Tihosuco, which took place that year during the Caste War. Subsequently, Cetina's work was published in a variety of different newspapers and periodicals, including La Esperanza, Biblioteca de Señoritas, El Federalista, La Primavera, Diario del Bello Sexo, El Eco de Ambos Mundos, Violetas del Anáhuac, and La Mujer Mexicana. She also served as an editor for the magazine El Recreo del Hogar (transl. 'Home Recreation'), where many of her poems also appeared. In 1910, several poems written by Cetina were included posthumously in the anthology Poetisas Mexicanas, which was compiled by journalist and founder of the Mexican Bibliographic Institute José María Vigil.

Cetina's poetry is noted for its nationalistic themes, with some, such as biographer Rodolfo Menéndez de la Peña, referring to her as the "cantora de la patria" (transl. 'singer of the homeland'). One example of this is her poem "Tres de marzo", (transl. 'Third of March') (Note: Also known as "Poema dedicado al aniversario luctuoso de Manuel Cepeda Peraza" (transl. 'Poem dedicated to the anniversary of the death of Manuel Cepeda Peraza').) which was written to praise Governor Cepeda for opening the Instituto. In the poem, she calls Cepeda a "liberator" and says that the girls of the institute also "pay tribute" to him. Other common themes identified in Cetina's poetry include education, love, progress, and science.

=== Fiction ===
Cetina was one of the first women in Mexico to publish a novel, Julia, which was released in installments in La Siempreviva from 22 August 1870 to 6 February 1871 and dedicated to fellow La Siempreviva member Adelaida Carrerá de la Fuente. Julia, which bears the same name as and is influenced by the novel Julia by Ignacio Manuel Altamirano, is a romance featuring the eponymous Julia and her lover Ernesto. Ernesto is forced to leave Julia behind in Mexico when his father forces him to go to Spain, where it is arranged for him to marry his cousin. As a result, Julia distances herself from Ernesto and his family, causing him to become depressed and eventually leading to his suicide. In his suicide note, Ernesto requests that his mother look after Julia, and when the two meet at Ernesto's grave, they promise to stay connected to honor Ernesto's memory. Julia has been cited as a "clear example of a 19th-century romantic novel" with themes of love, feminine beauty, and universal human values.

Cetina also published several short stories in La Siempreviva, including "Cuento del Mar" (transl. 'Tale of the Sea') and "Gratitud" (transl. 'Gratitude'). In addition, she received praise for her work as a playwright, premiering the play Deudas del Corazón (transl. 'Debts of the Heart') in 1892 at the Peón Contreras theater in Mérida. The governor at the time, Daniel Traconis, was an admirer of the play, writing to congratulate Cetina on its warm reception.

== Contributions to feminism ==
And what do we ask for in order to carry out our work? Nothing. And what do we need? That you, dear sisters, to whom we dedicate our work, grant us protection, because in union there is strength; let us all feel the holy flame of progress burning in our hearts so that by realizing the idea of our society, we can say to the face of the civilized world: Enough; the time has come for the enlightenment of women, the source of peace in the home and tranquility in the people; our sisters, onward.

— La Siempreviva, 1870

Cetina is considered to be one of Mexico's "earliest feminists" by expert on Latin American philosophy Stephanie Rivera Berruz. She wrote at length about women's role in society and the need for women's emancipation, particularly in La Siempreviva. The goal of La Siempreviva was to encourage women's education, particularly in the fields of literature and music, and to create support networks for women where they could promote the cause of "women's enlightenment".

Cetina taught several attendees of the First Feminist Congress of Yucatán, (Note: Specifically, López, Peniche, and former Yucatecan Secretary of Education Raúl Godoy Montañez in the prologue to Menéndez's biography of Cetina all identify her as their teacher. Infante, however, says that this may be an assumption.) including Nelly Aznar, Susana Betancourt, Elvia Carrillo Puerto, Raquel Dzib Cicero, Gloria Mireya Rosado, Eusebia Pérez, and Rosa Torre González. In 1922, Carillo helped found the Rita Cetina Gutiérrez Feminist League, which gave lectures to women on subjects such as home economics, childcare, and hygiene.

== Death and legacy ==
Cetina died on 11 October 1908 at the age of 62. After her death, on 12 and 13 October, a day of mourning was observed, with the flag being lowered to half-mast in schools and dormitories and classes being suspended throughout Yucatán. A month after her death, sculptor and architect Almo Strenta was commissioned to create a commemorative bust of Cetina to be placed in the Institute. It was moved to the Rotunda of the Illustrious Teachers of Yucatán in 2010, along with her remains. Dolores Correa Zapata, founder of the Women's Protective Society and the magazine La Mujer Mexicana (transl. 'The Mexican Woman'), eulogized Cetina thusly:

More than a poet, Ms. Cetina Gutiérrez is worthy of the admiration and gratitude of the country as a faithful and hardworking teacher... For 32 years, she has dedicated the energies of her spirit, strong and elevated, to the noble art of teaching. With all the constancy and faith of a true apostle, she poured out the purest sap of her sensitive and dreamy soul, cultivating childlike spirits, nourishing with her science and tenderness the intelligence and heart of many girls who are now notable teachers and models of Yucatecan mothers... 32 years of constant self-denial and assiduous work... [is well-deserving] of praise and reward.

== Selected works ==
- (1866) "Oda a los héroes de Tihosuco" (transl. 'Ode to the heroes of Tihosuco'; featured in Rita Cetina Gutiérrez)
- (1869) "Babilonia" (transl. 'Babylon'; featured and originally published in El Renacimiento)
- (1870) "A nuestro sexo" (transl. 'Our sex'; featured in Los vuelos de la rosa; originally published in La Siempreviva)
- (1870) "A mis apreciables amigos" (transl. 'To my dear friends'; featured in La poesía de las mujeres en la prensa femenina del Siglo XIX en México; originally published in La Siempreviva)
- (1870) "Romance" (transl. 'Romance'; featured in Los vuelos de la rosa; originally published in La Siempreviva)
- (1871) "Su sombra" (transl. 'His shadow'; featured in Los vuelos de la rosa; originally published in La Siempreviva)
- (1871) "Un lirio" (transl. 'A lily'; featured in Los vuelos de la rosa; originally published in La Siempreviva)
- (1871) "Resignación" (transl. 'Resignation'; featured in Los vuelos de la rosa; originally published in La Siempreviva)
- (1871) "Merida" (featured in La poesía de las mujeres en la prensa femenina del Siglo XIX en México; originally published in La Siempreviva)
- (1888) "Tres de marzo" (transl. 'Third of March'; excerpt featured in Rita Cetina)

== Sources and further reading ==
- Avelar Mayer, María de los Ángeles (2011). La Siempreviva. Voz Pionera del Sur (1870-1872) [La Siempreviva. Pioneer Voice of the South (1870-1872)] (Bachelor's thesis) (in Spanish). Universidad Nacional Autónoma de México. hdl:20.500.14330/TES01000681028.
- Checa-Artasu, Martín Manuel; Niglio, Olimpia (2021). Arquitectos y Artistas en la Diáspora Italiana en Latinoamérica [Architects and Artists in the Italian Diaspora in Latin America] (in Spanish). Rome: Aracne. ISBN 979-12-5994-390-3.
  - Checa-Artasu, Martín Manuel. "Escultores y Marmlolistas Italianos en La Ciudad de México en el Primer Tervia del Siglo XX un Recuento Biográfico". In Checa-Artasu & Niglio (2021).
- Colección las maestras de México: Rita Cetina, Dolores Correa, Laura Méndez, Rosaura Zapata [Collection of the teachers of Mexico: Rita Cetina, Dolores Correa, Laura Méndez, Rosaura Zapata] (in Spanish). México, D.F: Instituto Nacional de Estudios Históricos de las Revoluciones de Mexico. 2015. ISBN 978-607-9419-15-8.
  - Infante Vargas, Lucrecia. "Rita Cetina Gutiérrez: Primera Mentora Yucateca (1846-1908)". In Colección las maestras de México (2015).
- González Rey, Diana Crucelly (2014). La educación de las niñas en el Yucatán del Porfiriato, 1870 - 1911 [Girls' education in Yucatan during the Porfiriato, 1870 - 1911.] (Master's thesis) (in Spanish). Centro de Investigaciones y Estudios Superiores en Antropología Social.
- Lavrin, Asunción (1978). Latin American women: historical perspectives. Westport: Greenwood Press. ISBN 978-0-313-20309-1.
- Luna Aguilar, Francisca Leticia (2014). La poesía de las mujeres en la prensa femenina del Siglo XIX en México (las violetas del Anáhuac y la siempreviva) [Women's poetry in the women's press of the 19th century in Mexico (the violets of Anáhuac and the everlasting flower)] (Bachelor's thesis) (in Spanish). Universidad Nacional Autónoma de México.
- Menéndez de la Peña, Rodolfo (2011) [1909]. Rita Cetina Gutiérrez: 1846-1908 (in Spanish). Mérida: Ilustres Maestros de Yucatán, Casa de la Historia de la Educación de Yucatán. OCLC 1457926311.
- Peniche Rivero, Piedad (2015). Rita Cetina, La Siempreviva y el Instituto Literario de Niñas [Rita Cetina, The Siempreviva and the Girls' Literary Institute] (in Spanish). México City: Instituto Nacional de Estudios Históricos de las Revoluciones de México. ISBN 978-607-9419-47-9. OCLC 952578746.
- Reyes Ramírez, Rubén (2005). Los vuelos de la rosa. Mujeres en la poesía de Yucatán. Antología [The Flights of the Rose. Women in the Poetry of Yucatan. Anthology] (in Spanish). ISBN 968-7871-43-1.
- Romano, Yolanda; Velázquez García, Sara, eds. (2018). Las inéditas: voces femeninas más allá del silencio [The unpublished: female voices beyond silence] (in Spanish). Salamanca: Ediciones Universidad de Salamanca. ISBN 978-84-9012-887-9.
  - López Ramírez, Claudia Adriana. "Rita Cetina Gutiérrez, una Esctitora "Inédita" del México Decimonónico". In Romano & Velázquez García (2018).
- Rosado Rosado, Georgina; Rosado Avilés, Celia; Canto Alococer, Alicia, eds. (2016). Las hijas de Eva: las semillas de una revolución [Eve's daughters: the seeds of a revolution] (in Spanish). Mérida, Yucatán, México: Universidad Autónoma de Yucatán. ISBN 978-607-9405-65-6.
  - López Ramírez, Claudia Adriana. "Lo femenino en "Julia" la novela corta de Rita Cetina Gutiérrez". In Rosado Rosado, Rosado Avilés & Canto Alococer (2016).
