= Salvador Alvarado =

Mexican politician (1880–1924)

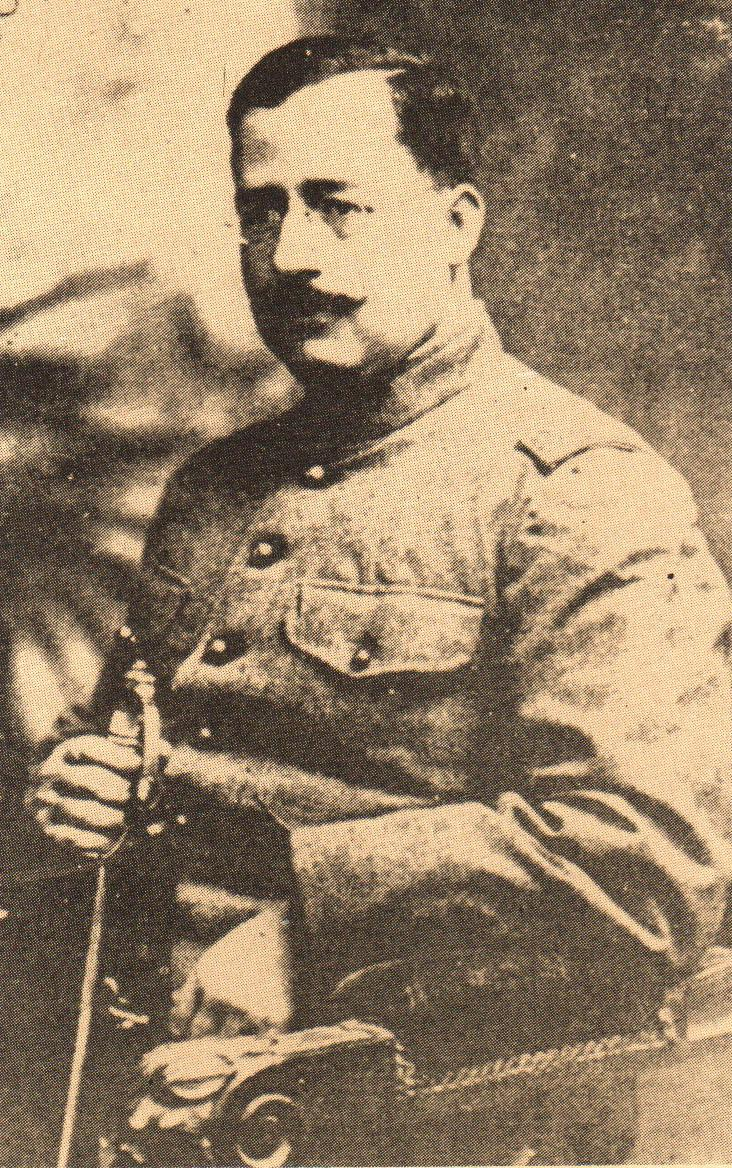
- Alvarado in 1917

Governor of Yucatán
- In office 1915–1918
- Preceded by: Abel Ortiz Argumedo
- Succeeded by: Carlos Castro Morales

Personal details
- Born: September 16, 1880 Culiacán, Sinaloa, Mexico
- Died: June 10, 1924 (aged 43) El Hormiguero Ranchero, near Palenque, Chiapas, Mexico
- Party: Partido Socialista de Yucatán
- Spouse(s): 1st unknown; 2nd Laura Manzano
- Profession: soldier

Salvador Alvarado Rubio (September 16, 1880 – June 10, 1924) was a general and politician during the Mexican Revolution. He served in the Constitutional Army under President Venustiano Carranza. Alvarado was the Governor of Yucatán from February 1915 to November, 1918, and Secretary of the Treasury under President Adolfo de la Huerta. There is a Salvador Alvarado Municipality in the State of Sinaloa, where he was born, named in his honor.

== Early life and personal life ==
Salvador Alvarado was born on September 16, 1880, in Culiacán, in the Mexican state of Sinaloa to Timoteo Alvarado and Antonia Rubio. His family moved to a Yaqui pueblo, known as Pótam, in Sonora when Alvarado was around eight years old. As a young man, he moved to the port of Guaymas and worked in the pharmacy of Don Luis G. Dávila. He later moved to Cananea, where he opened his own pharmacy and worked for several years as a pharmacist and merchant.

In 1906, he joined the Mexican Liberal Party whose members were against the re-election of President Porfirio Díaz and began participating in clandestine activities for Díaz's opponent Ricardo Flores Magón. In 1910 Alvarado joined the Anti-Reelectionist Party in Sonora, which had been established by, Benjamín G. Hill. Later that same year, he and other young idealists with revolutionary fervor attacked a military barracks in Hermosillo, Sonora. Their failed assault resulted in some of the rebels being executed and others, like Salvador Alvarado, escaped into Arizona.

Alvarado was a widower when he came to Yucatán. After a lengthy courtship, he married Laura Manzano, a local young woman of modest means.

== Military career ==
In 1911, when Francisco I. Madero who had also been exiled into Texas, wrote the Plan of San Luis Potosí calling for the election to be declared null and void, and for Díaz to be overthrown, Alvarado recrossed the border into Mexico. He joined the revolutionary army as a captain, fighting Porfirio Díaz, under the command of Juan G. Carvajal. In February 1911, Madero and his forces attacked the city of Casas Grandes, Chihuahua and defeated Díaz's troops. A short time later, two of Madero's generals, Pascual Orozco and Pancho Villa against Madero's orders, attacked and defeated Díaz's federales at Ciudad Juárez, just across the border from El Paso, Texas. These victories led, in May 1911, to Porfírio Díaz's resignation and exile. A peace treaty was signed, Madero and his troops marched into Mexico City, elections were held and in November, 1911, Francisco Madero became Mexico's new President.

Northern Mexico at this time was in open rebellion. In Sonora the Yaqui were waging guerrilla warfare, Morelos and Durango were also unstable, and Pascual Orozco, former Madero supporter, was attempting to usurp the authority of Chihuahua governor Abraham González. The conflicts kept Alvarado busy and he steadily climbed the military ranks from Major to Lieutenant Colonel to Colonel and finally General. In November 1911, Emiliano Zapata, angered at Madero's failure to implement land reform, wrote the Plan of Ayala, declaring Madero to be a traitor, created a land reform plan, and declared Madero's former general Orozco head of their revolt. Madero sent General Victoriano Huerta in 1912, to quash their revolt and he quickly defeated Orozco and sent him into exile. Alvarado fought alongside Huerta against Orozco and was promoted to the Chief of the Federal Auxiliary.

Madero was attempting to balance between the Right (who wanted to retain their rights and privileges) and the Left (who wanted reform, and particularly land reform). With the events known as "La Decena Trágica" (Ten Tragic Days), which occurred from 9 to 19 February 1913, Mexico City was under siege and bombardment, Huerta gained control of the military, staged a coup d'état, had Madero, his vice president and most loyal officers killed and declared himself president. Within days of the murder of Madero and Gonzalez, Venustiano Carranza took over as the revolutionary leader, calling himself "First Chief of the Constitutionalist Forces". Alvarado did not recognize the presidency of Huerta and immediately joined the constitutionalist revolution led by Carranza, who promoted him to Brigadier General, Commander of the Parade Ground of Mexico City, and Commander of the Army of the Southeast.

By June 1914, José María Maytorena, Maderista Governor of Sonora, whose government was being undermined by Alvarado, Calles, Obregon and Carranza, gave his support to Villa in the struggle against Carranza. Maytorena's Yaqui generals Francisco Urbalejo and Jose Maria Acosta then stated they would shoot Alvarado if he led an attempt to remove Maytorena from office or command of his forces. In July, Alvarado was sent to the port of Guaymas, was captured and imprisoned in July by Maytorena, but was able to escape in late September. He made his way to join Carranza in the center of Mexico and was ordered to proceed to Puebla to organize the Constitutionalist troops of Puebla and Tlaxcala. On 8 July 1914, Huerta resigned his presidency and was succeeded by Francisco S. Carvajal, who also resigned, just over a month later on 12 August 1914. With the triumph of the constitutionalists, Carranza dispatched many of his officers to bring order and establish governments in various states.

On 27 February 1915, Carranza named Alvarado Governor and military commander of Yucatán. His forces had little difficulty in putting down the rebel movement and by 19 March 1915, Alvarado had arrived in the capital of Mérida.

== Governorship ==
Alvarado took six months after arriving in Mérida to evaluate the conditions he found, gathering data from all social levels assisted by local Yucatecos. He staffed his bureaucracy with a mix of "conservative planters and radical intellectuals" and forged a coalition to restructure society. One of his first actions was to address the situation of the Maya peasants and liberate them from serfdom, prohibiting their confinement, forced guardianships, retention of their children, and whipping as well as other corporal punishment. He canceled their indenture debts with the landowners and established laws for women and child laborers, including domestic workers, defining maximum hours, minimum pay, mandatory rest periods, health and safety standards, and prohibitions on immoral employment. His vision was to change the almost feudal Hacienda system into a capitalist system converting the peones into true proletarian workers who were paid wages and in turn would increase production for the Henequin plantation owners.

Alvarado established "Tribunals of the Revolution" in each of the 16 partidos (districts) of the state to ensure that courts were accessible to everyone. Lawyers were prohibited, only the commander and secretary of the military court were allowed to participate, so that judgments were quickly obtained and unintimidating to the ignorant or poor. The military commanders resolved more than 3,600 cases ranging from reparations of robbery to abandonment to payments for rape or loss of honor. Alvarado also put an end to "Cohecho Investigations," a misuse of the Sedition Law known as Circular Number One, which haciendados were using against workers to punish them for actions or words that might cause other workers to question working conditions. Without exception, prior to Alvarado, those accused were sentenced to jail. Though prosecutions stopped under Alvarado, he did not give retroactive justice in the case of cohecho violations, as he did in cases of beatings or nonpayment of wages.

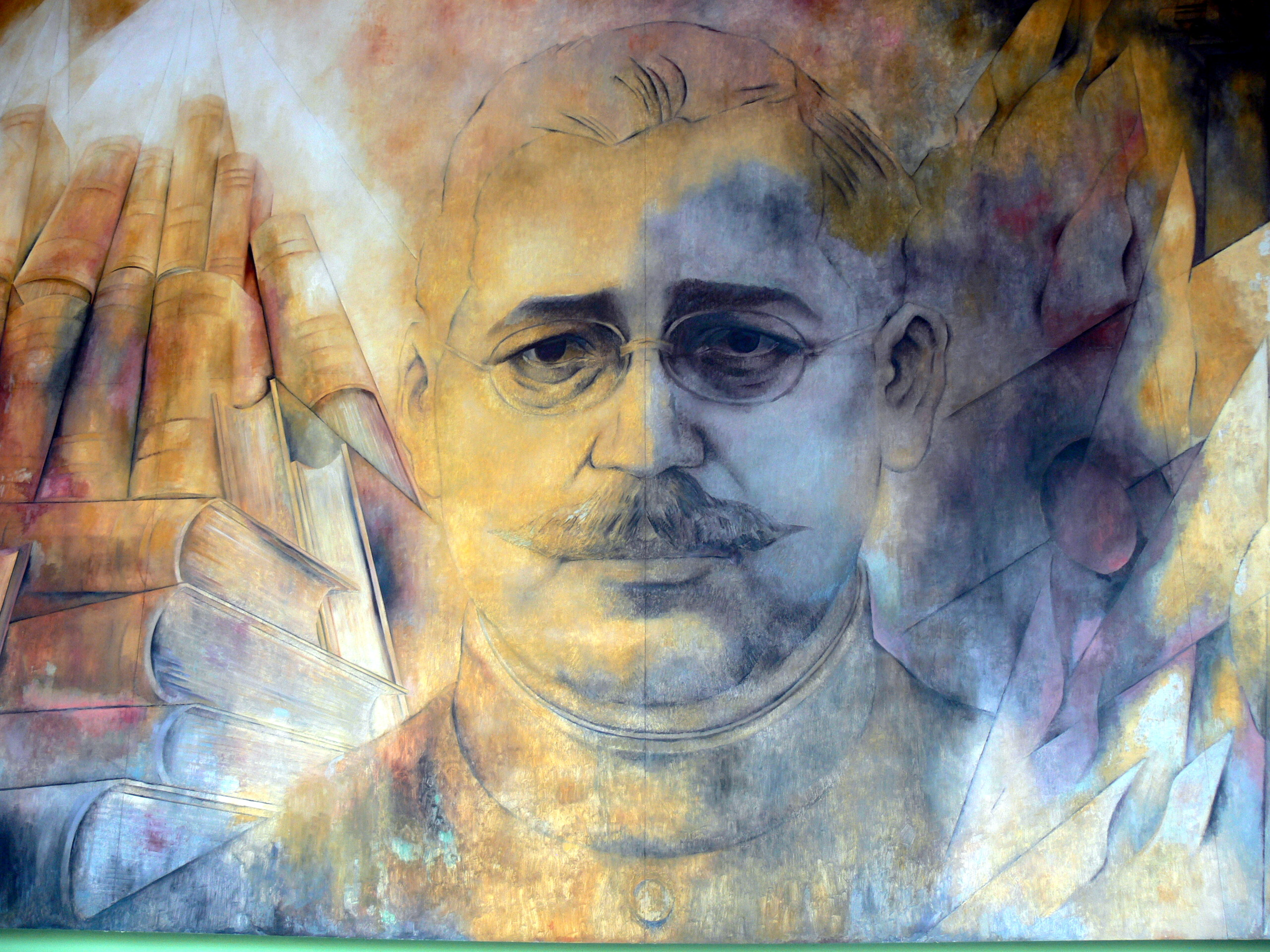
Mural by Fernando Castro Pacheco: Salvador Alvarado, Governor of Yucatán 1915–1918, at the Palacio de Gobierno, Mérida, Mexico

Alvarado claimed that he had passed over 1,000 decrees during his three-year tenure as governor. One of his first acts reformed what was known as the "Five Sisters" – labor, land, property title registration, state treasury and municipal governance. In addition to freeing the Maya from debt servitude, he created Agrarian Committees in each municipality to oversee land and farm worker issues. Alvarado also established the agente de propaganda, a proto-ombudsman position, who was responsible for reporting abuses against common people by the landed class and merchants or violations of law. These local "agents," like Felipe Carrillo Puerto, a later Yucatán governor, spoke both Spanish and Maya and helped create a sense of local justice and access in even the most remote or smallest village.

Having established controls for peasants and land owners, Alvarado turned to education reform. He passed laws making education mandatory, secular and free and required that it focus on literacy, reading, writing, arithmetic and civic responsibility. Alvarado established agricultural, fine arts, arts and crafts schools and founded the Escuela Libre de Derecho, a free academic institution for teaching law. In all, he created more than 1000 schools, some of them co-educational, 300 libraries, and drove the founding of a music conservatory.

His labor reforms included minimum wages, maximum hours, minimum working standards, accident compensation, child regulations and the right to strike, as well as prohibiting employers from forcing their religious beliefs on workers. He passed laws both recognizing and legalizing unionization and established an umbrella organization Casa del Obrero Mundial (The House of the World Worker) to encourage union workers toward active political participation.

Alvarado had studied both European and United States feminist theory and socialism and passed a series of laws aimed at freeing women from their traditional servitude, as he had the Maya. The protections on labor were extended to cover domestic workers. Because he felt that vice was particularly hard on women and families, a series of acts outlawing bullfights, drinking, gambling, lotteries and raffles were passed. Alvarado's prohibition law was one of the most restrictive in Mexico and even made drunkenness sufficient grounds for divorce. He did not pass laws criminalizing prostitution, but instead required regular health inspections for prostitutes. Anti-vice legislation aimed to eliminate bordellos and pimps, and fined men who used prostitutes or passed on venereal disease.

Because he believed that religious fanaticism and loyalty to the church, rather than the state, was harmful and hampered the development of a modern society, Alvarado closed churches, confiscating icons and relics, and removed priests from state offices. He also passed legislation to establish old age pensions and a law which created an office of Public Works.

Alvarado's broad range of legislation was accompanied by his encouragement of civic participation. He called on teachers to hold the First Congress on Educational Campaigns in the State. He also drove the First Feminist Congress in Mexico, which was held in Mérida in 1916.

When Alvarado was recalled for military duty in other parts of Mexico in 1918, he appointed Carlos Castro Morales to succeed him and Felipe Carrillo Puerto as head of the Partido Socialista de Yucatán, the Yucatecan Socialist Party.

== Carranza appointment and exile ==
In 1917, Carranza appointed Alvarado Chief of Military Operations for Southeast Mexico, which required that Alvarado spend many months away from Mérida. In November 1918, Alvarado was permanently recalled by Carranza.

After the passage of the Constitution of 1917, Carranza appeared to turn his back on revolutionary principles. Lands that had been seized and nationalized were being turned over to his generals to secure their loyalty and in the process, created what was perceived as a new landed gentry. Zapata and his rebels became the newest targets of Carranza's regime, causing devastation through warfare to the people of Morelos, who were already battling the 1918 flu pandemic. Zapata's 1919 assassination, the resignation of Álvaro Obregón as Minister of War, and the failure to recognize Salvador Alvarado's maxim "give them land, and you bind them to Mexico," increasingly alienated Carranza's former allies. Dissolution of support created factionalism and one of the most powerful factions was Los Sonorenses (The Sonoran Men), which included Adolfo de la Huerta, Alvaro Obregón, Plutarco Elías Calles, Benjamín G. Hill, and Salvador Alvarado.

Alvarado founded a newspaper in 1919, El Heraldo de México, which he used as a platform to discuss intellectual ideals. Some, including Obregón, felt that the paper was a stage for Alvarado to gain national exposure for a presidential bid, but the claim was denied by Alvarado. Obregón remained skeptical of the denial and tensions between the two slowly began escalating.

Alvarado's political activities also angered Carranza, who had him arrested. He was released in January, 1920 and exiled to the United States. Returning from exile, Alvarado and other of Los Sonorenses joined Obregón's Plan of Agua Prieta in April, 1920.

== Secretary of the Treasury and rebellion ==
Following Carranza's assassination and Adolfo de la Huerta's election as the Interim President of Mexico on 1 June 1920, Alvarado was named Secretary of the Treasury. De la Huerta had inherited an almost bankrupt government, and Alvarado made numerous trips to New York City to secure funds through both loans and publicity of Yucatecan henequin.

In 1921 de la Huerta handed over power from his interim government to Álvaro Obregón and Alvarado left the Treasury and began working as the Director of Free Ports and Secretary of the Advisory Board of Petroleum. In 1922, Alvarado was in Yucatán and U.S. newspapers were reporting that he was meeting with leaders who were in opposition to Obregón and his chosen successor, Plutarco Elías Calles. By 1923, open rebellion between de la Huerta and Obregón was declared with Alvarado supporting his childhood friend, de la Huerta.

== Persecution and death ==
De la Huerta was driven into exile in Los Angeles, California on March 7, 1924. Though Alvarado tried to flee to Canada, the United States, and then Guatemala, he was relentlessly pursued by Obregón's men. A few months after de la Huerta's escape, Alvarado was ambushed while fleeing from Obregón's force at El Hormiguero ranchero, between Tenosique, Tabasco and Palenque, Chiapas and was killed on 10 June 1924.

== Published works ==
Alvarado published three works, in Spanish, during his lifetime:

- Salvador Alvarado, Mi Actuación Revolucionaria en Yucatán (My Revolutionary Performance in Mexico), 1918.
- Salvador Alvarado, (1879-1924) La Reconstrucción de México (The Reconstruction of Mexico), 1919.
- Salvador Alvarado, Carta al pueblo de Yucatán: Mi Sueño (Letter to the People of Yucatán: My Dream)

Preceded by Abel Ortiz Argumedo	Governor of Yucatán; 1915–1917	Succeeded by Carlos Castro Morales
Preceded by Luis Cabrera Lobato	Secretary of Finance and Public Credit; 1920	Succeeded by Adolfo de la Huerta
