= Women in Mexico =

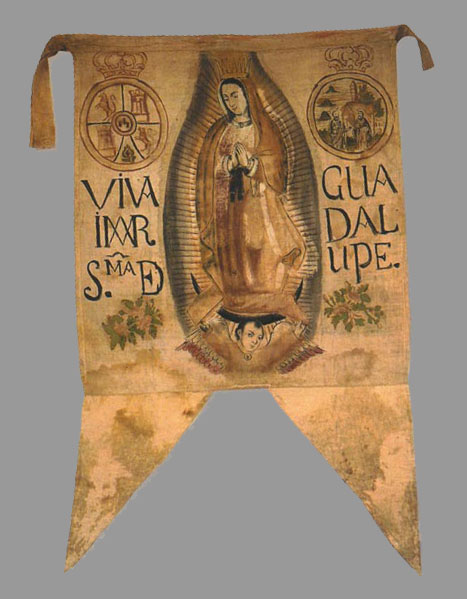
The revolutionary banner carried by Miguel Hidalgo and his insurgent army during the Mexican War of Independence representing Our Lady of Guadalupe

The status of women in Mexico has changed significantly over time. Until the twentieth century, Mexico was an overwhelmingly rural country, with rural women's status defined within the context of the family and local community. With urbanization beginning in the sixteenth century, following the Spanish conquest of the Aztec Empire, cities have provided economic and social opportunities not possible within rural villages. Roman Catholicism in Mexico has shaped societal attitudes about women's social role, emphasizing the role of women as nurturers of the family, with the Virgin Mary as a model. Marianismo has been an ideal, with women's role as being within the family under the authority of men. In the twentieth century, Mexican women made great strides towards a more equal legal and social status. In 1953 women in Mexico were granted the right to vote in national elections.

Urban women in Mexico worked in factories, the earliest being the tobacco factories set up in major Mexican cities as part of the lucrative tobacco monopoly. Women ran a variety of enterprises in the colonial era, with the widows of elite businessmen continuing to run the family business. In the prehispanic and colonial periods, non-elite women were small-scale sellers in markets. In the late nineteenth century, as Mexico allowed foreign investment in industrial enterprises, women found increased opportunities to work outside the home. Women began increasingly working in factories, working in portable food carts, and owning their own business. “In 1910, women made up 14% of the workforce, by 2008 they were 38%”.

Mexican women face discrimination and at times harassment from the men exercising machismo against them. Although women in Mexico are making great advances, they are faced with the traditional expectation of being the head of the household. Researcher Margarita Valdés noted that while there are few inequities imposed by law or policy in Mexico, gender inequalities perpetuated by social structures and Mexican cultural expectations limit the capabilities of Mexican women.

In Linda A. Curcio-Nagy research paper, which dates back to Mexico City in the 1600s, mistreatment of women under New Spain colonial reign is explored through a scandalous trail. The paper follows the life of Doña Josefa de Angulo in regard to an Inquisition trail that was brought forth due to the mistreatment of women at The Recogimiento de la Magdalena. Josefa was married to Juan de Vilches; however, he sent her to Recogimiento (a kind of home for "wayward women") because she could would not conformed to patriarchal norms and was considered disobedient. The paper by Curcio-Nagy covers the details of scandal, society in Mexico City, and colonial male patriarchal religious influence and how Josefa’s actions demonstrate female agency and a challenge to gendered norms in colonial New Spain.

As of 2014, Mexico has the 16th highest female homicide rate in the world.

== History ==
=== Pre-Columbian societies ===
==== Maya ====
The Mayan civilization was initially established during the Pre-Classic period (c. 2000 BC to 250 AD). According to the consensus chronology of Mesoamerica, many Mayan cities reached their highest state of development during the Classical period (c. 250 to 900 AD), and continued throughout the post-Classical period until the arrival of the Spanish in 1519 AD. Women within Mayan society were limited in regards to status, marriage, and inheritance. In all pre-Columbian societies, marriage was the ideal state for women beyond the age of puberty. Noble women were often married to the rulers of neighboring kingdoms, thus creating dynastic alliances

Although the majority of these women had few political responsibilities, these women were vital to the political fabric of the state. Elite women enjoyed a high status within their society and were sometimes rulers of city states. Among a handful of female rulers were Lady Ahpo-Katum of Piedras Negras, and Lady Apho-He of Palenque. Although women had little political influence, Mayan glyph data include many scenes with a female participating in various public activities and genealogies trace male rulers' right to power through female members of their family.

Women could not own or inherit land. They owned what were considered 'feminine goods', which included household objects, domestic animals, beehives, and their own clothing. Women could bequeath their property, but it was gender specific and was usually not of much financial value.

==== Aztec ====
Usual female clothing of the Nahua people of the Mexica and therefore of the Nahua peoples in general in pre-Hispanic times.

The term 'Aztec' refers to certain ethnic groups of central Mexico, particularly those groups who spoke the Náhuatl language and who dominated large parts of Mesoamerica from the 1300 A.D. to 1500 A.D. Women within Aztec society were prepared from birth to be wives and mothers and to produce tribute goods that each household owed. Each girl was given small spindles and shuttles to symbolize her future role in household production. Her umbilical cord was buried near the fireplace of her house in the hope that she would be a good keeper of the home.

Growing up, unmarried girls were expected to be virgins and were closely chaperoned to ensure their virginity stayed intact until their marriage. Girls were married soon after reaching puberty as marriage was considered the ideal state for women. It is estimated that as many as ninety-five percent of indigenous women were married. Couples were expected to stay together, however Aztec society did recognize divorce, with each partner retaining their own property brought into the marriage after divorce.

Similar to Mayan society, Aztec noblewomen had little choice in their marriage as it was a matter of state policy to create alliances. In regards to inheritance and property rights, Aztec women were severely limited. Although women were allowed to inherit property, their rights to it were more to usage rights. Property given to children was much freeing where it could be bequeathed or sold.

=== Spanish conquest ===
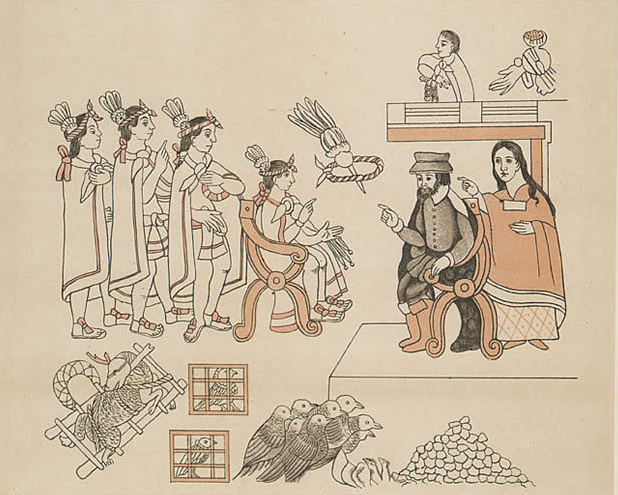
Hernán Cortés and La Malinche meet Moctezuma II in Tenochtitlan, November 8, 1519.

When the Spanish conquistadores arrived in Mexico, they needed help to conquer the land. Although often overlooked in the history of the conquest, individual women facilitated the defeat of the powerful Aztec Empire. Women possessed knowledge of the land and the local language. One of the most notable women who assisted Hernán Cortés during the conquest period of Mexico was Doña Marina, or Malinche, who knew both the Nahuatl and Mayan language and later learned Spanish.

Born a Nahua, or an Aztec, Marina was sold into slavery by her own people to the Mayans and eventually was given to Cortés as a payment of tribute. To Cortés, Doña Marina was a valuable asset in overthrowing the Aztec empire based in Tenochtitlán (now Mexico City) and was always seen at his side, even during battles with the Aztecs and Mayans.

Malinche had become the translator and the mistress of Hernán Cortés. Though Doña Marina was useful to Cortés, he was “reluctant to give Doña Marina credit, referring to her as ‘my interpreter, who is an Indian woman’”. During the conquest, women were viewed as objects that could be exploited by men to gain a higher standing in society. Malinche was considered a spoil of conquest to the men surrounding her and was originally intended to sexually please the soldiers.

Like Malinche, many women were offered to the conquistadors as an offering because both cultures viewed women as objects to be gifted to others. Since few women traveled to the New World, native females were considered a treasure that needed to be Christianized. It is believed that there were ulterior motives in the Christianization of indigenous individuals, especially women. Conquistadores were quick to convert the women and distribute them amongst themselves.

=== Spanish era ===
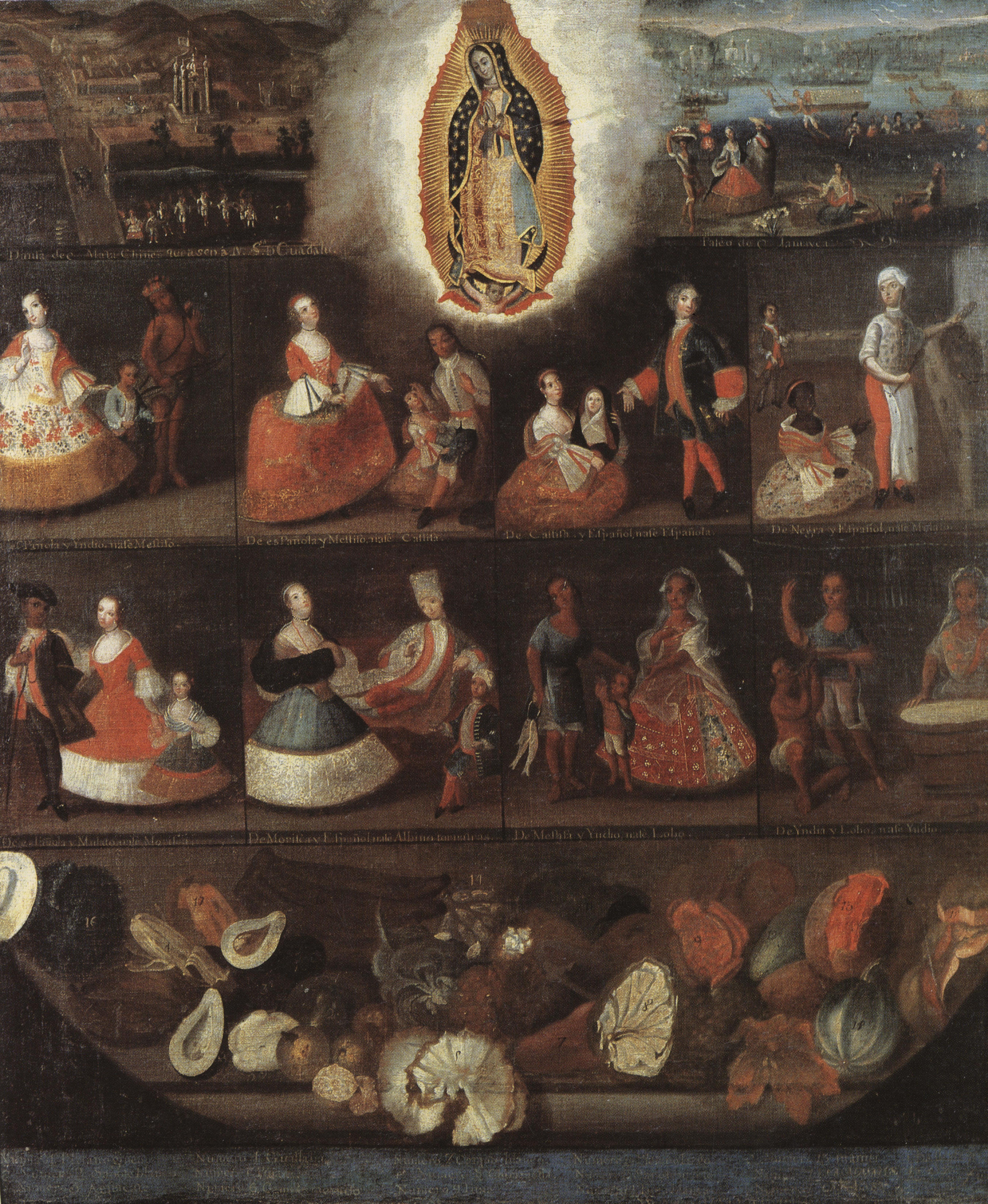
The casta racial system in New Spain. Luis de Mena, Virgin of Guadalupe and castas, 1750.

The division of social classes was essential and such divisions were expressed through the attire worn by individuals. Elite and upper-class women could afford expensive textiles imported from Spain. Due to the strong system of racial hierarchy, known as the sistema de castas, women tended to dress in accordance with their level of wealth and racial status. The racial hierarchy divided society first through separating the República de Españoles, which was the Hispanic sphere encompassing Spaniards, (Españoles) both peninsular- and American-born; Mestizos (mixed Español and Indian); Mulatos (mixed Negro and Español); Negros (Africans); and offspring of further mixed-race pairings. Regardless of the social status of Indian women, she would dress in compliance with Indian customs. Wealthy women were able to purchase superior materials for clothing.

The importance placed upon social class caused purity of blood to become a factor in regards to marriage. Women were affected by these policies as it was required for both men and women to submit documents proving their racial purity. European men sought elite Mexican women to marry and have children with, in order to retain or gain a higher status in society. Problems that occurred with providing documentation in blood purity are that males were the ones who were called as a witness. Women rarely were able to defend their purity and had to rely on men from the community.

Regardless of social class, women in eighteenth century Mexico City usually married for the first time between the ages of 17 and 27, with a median age of 20.5 years. Women were inclined to marry individuals belonging to the same social group as their fathers.

Education for women was surrounded by religion. Individuals believed that girls should be educated enough to read the Bible and religious devotionals, but should not be taught to write. When girls were provided with an education, they would live in convents and be instructed by nuns, with education being significantly limited. Of all the women who sought entry into Mexico City's convent of Corpus Christi, only 10 percent of elite Indian women had a formal education.

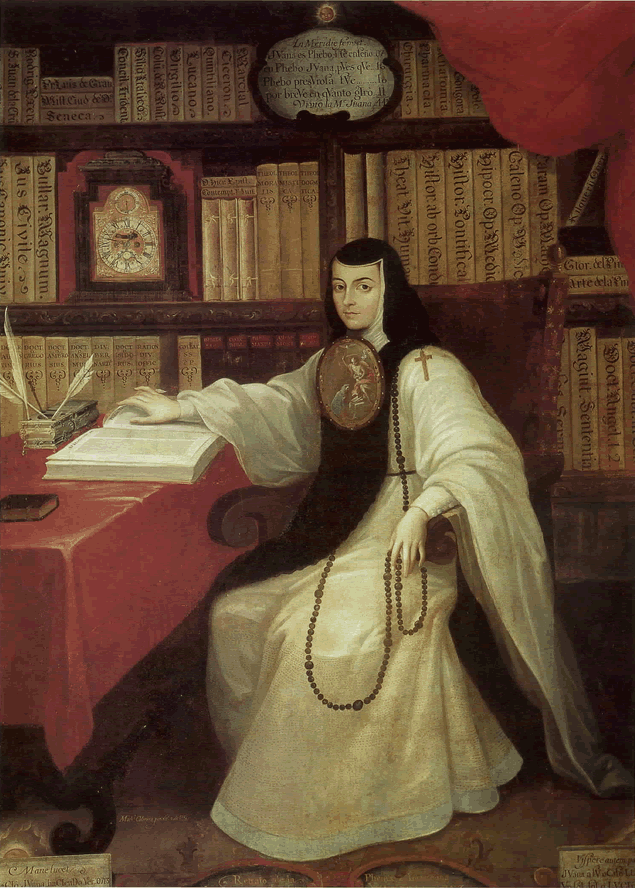
Sor Juana Inés de la Cruz by Miguel Cabrera (painter) ca. 1750.

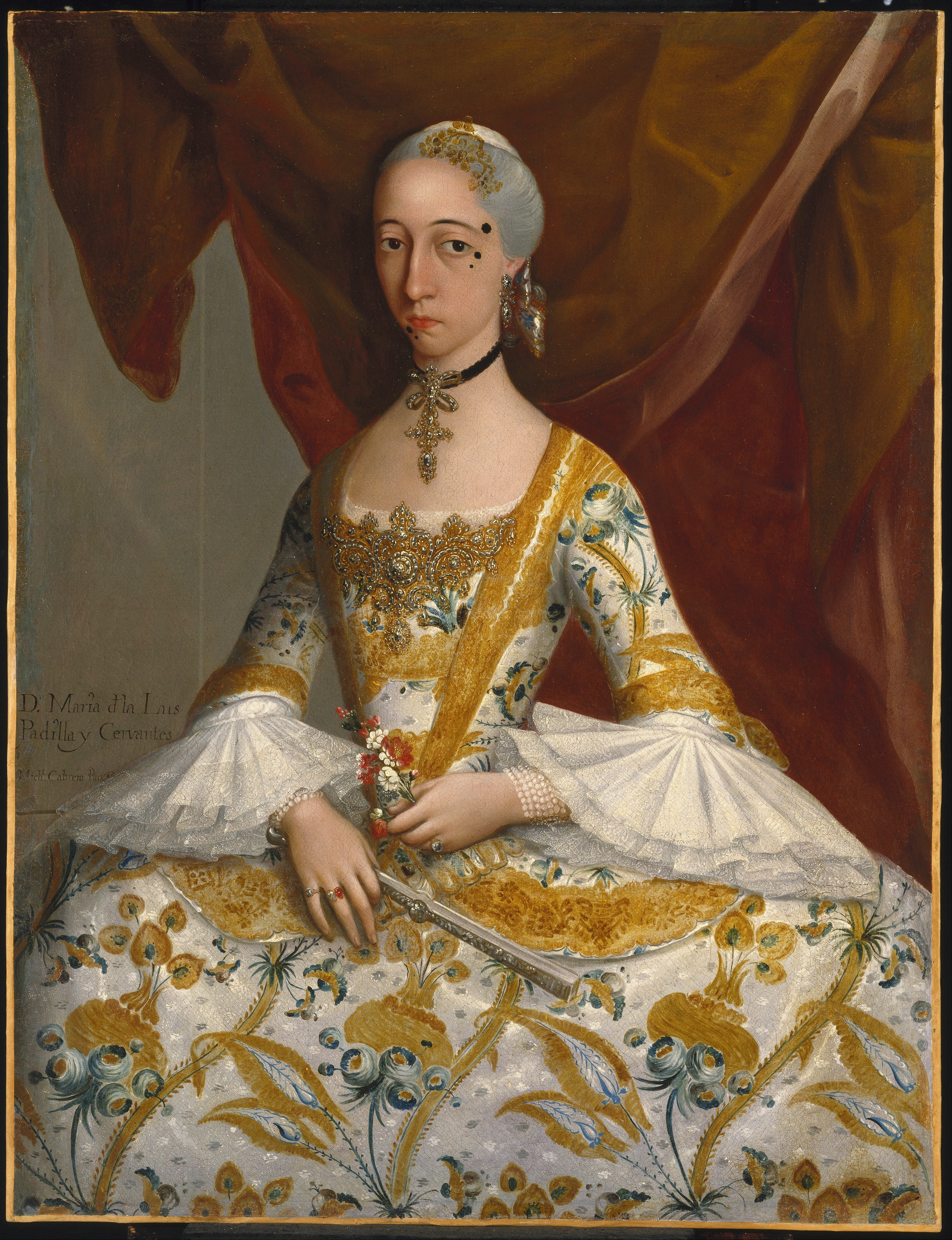
Miguel Cabrera (painter). Doña María de la Luz Padilla y Gómez de Cervantes, ca. 1760. Brooklyn Museum.

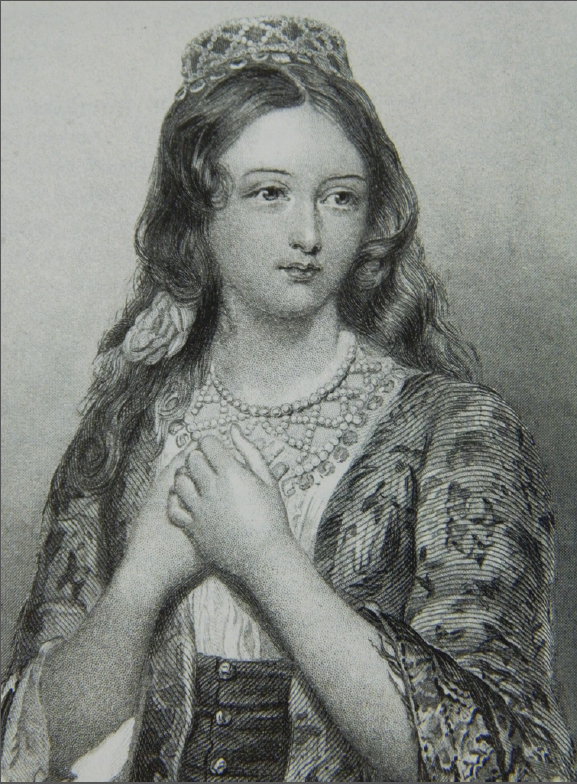
La Güera Rodríguez was an influential woman in New Spain society born 1778

=== Mexican War of Independence and early republic 1810-1850 ===
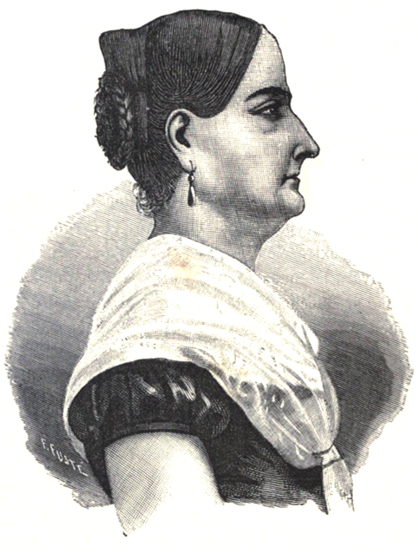
Josefa Ortiz de Domínguez, known as the Corregidora

The Mexican War of Independence was an armed conflict between the Mexican people and Spain. It began with the Grito de Dolores on September 16 of 1810 and officially ended on September 27 of 1821 when Spanish rule collapse and the Army of the Three Guarantees marched into Mexico City. Women participated in the Mexican War of Independence, most famously Josefa Ortiz de Domínguez, known in Mexican history as La Corregidora. Her remains were moved to the Monument to Independence in Mexico City; there are statues of her in her honor, and her face has appeared on Mexican currency. Other distinguished women of the era are Gertrudis Bocanegra, María Luisa Martínez de García Rojas, Manuela Medina, Rita Pérez de Moreno, Maria Fermina Rivera, María Ignacia Rodríguez de Velasco y Osorio Barba, better known as La Güera Rodríguez (Rodríguez the Fair); and Leona Vicario.

Following independence, some women in Zacatecas raised the question of citizenship for women. They petitioned for it, saying "women also wish to have the title of citizen .. to see ourselves in the census as 'La ciudadana' (woman citizen)." Independence affected women in both positive and negatives ways. Prior to the independence, women were only allowed to act as their children's guardians until the age of seven in cases of separation of widowhood. Post-independence laws allowed women to serve as guardians until the age of majority. Women continued to occupy domestic service positions although economic instability led to many households ending employment of domestic servants.

=== 19th c. Liberal Reform and Porfiriato 1850-1910 ===
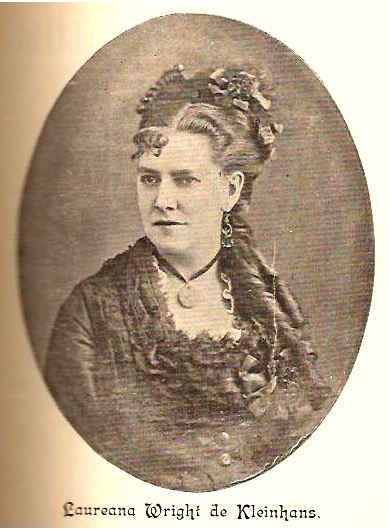
Laureana Wright de Kleinhans, considered the most brilliant and radical defender of women's emancipation.

As with Liberalism elsewhere, Liberalism in Mexico emphasized secular education as a path forward toward equality before the law. In the colonial era, there were limited opportunities for Mexican girls and women, but with the establishment of secular schools in the middle of the nineteenth century, girls had greater access to education, while women entered the teaching profession. Quite a number of them became advocates for women's rights, becoming active in politics, founding journals and newspapers, and attending international conferences for women's rights. Women teachers were part of the new middle class in Mexico, which also included women office workers in the private sector and government. Women also became involved in general improvement in society, including better hygiene and nutrition. Toward the end of the Porfiriato, the period when General Porfirio Díaz ruled Mexico (1876–1910), women began pressing for legal equality and the right to vote. The largest sector of Mexico's population was rural and indigenous or mixed-race, so that the movement for women's equality was carried forward by a very small sector of educated, urban women.

=== Mexican Revolution and its Consolidation, 1910-1940 ===
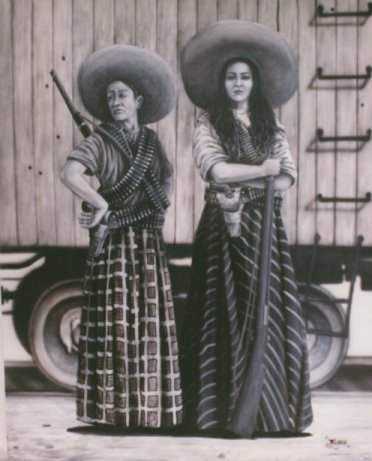
Depiction of «adelitas», or Soldaderas, of the Mexican Revolution. Petra Herrera known for bravery in battle.

The Mexican Revolution began in 1910 with an uprising led by Francisco I. Madero against the longstanding regime of Porfirio Diaz. This military phase is generally considered to have lasted through 1920. Most often it is the case that women involved in war are overlooked. Although the revolution is attributed to men, the dedication and participation women contributed, just as much as their male counterparts. Poor mestiza and indigenous women had a strong presence in the revolutionary conflict becoming camp followers often referred to in Mexico as soldaderas. Nellie Campobello was one of the few women to write a first-person account of the Mexican Revolution, Cartucho.

Most often, these women followed the army when a male relative joined and provided essential services such as food preparation, tending to the wounded, mending clothing, burying the dead, and retrieval of items from the battlefield. Women involved in the revolution were just as laden if not more so than men, carrying food, cooking supplies, and bedding. Many soldaderas took their children with them, often because their husband had joined or been conscripted into the army. In 1914, a count of Pancho Villa’s forces included 4,557 male soldiers, 1,256 soldaderas, and 554 children many of whom were babies or toddlers strapped to their mother’s backs. Many women picked up arms and joined in combat alongside men, often when a male comrade, their husband or brother had fallen.

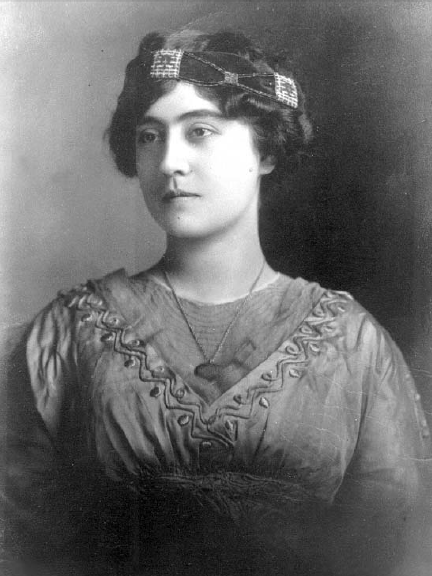
Elena Arizmendi, a Mexican feminist who established the Neutral White Cross organisation during the Mexican Revolution.

There were also many cases of women who fought in the revolution disguised as men, however most returned to female identities once the conflict had ended. The lasting impacts of the revolution have proved mixed at best. The revolution promised reforms and greater rights for women to one extent or another, but failed to live up to its promises. Thousands of women fought in the battles and provided necessary services to the armies, however their contributions have largely been forgotten and viewed as merely supportive.

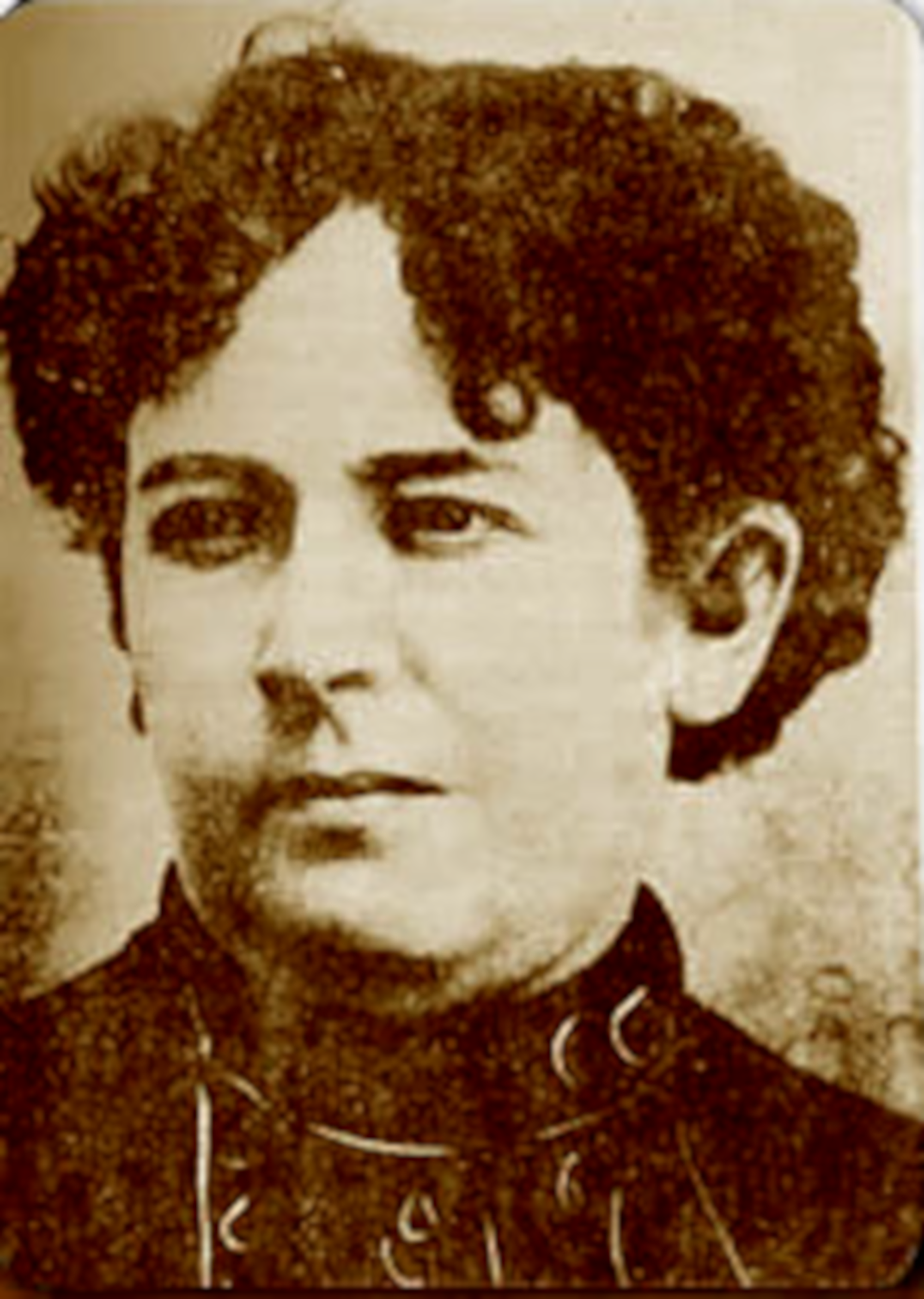
Dolores Jiménez y Muro Schoolteacher and revolutionary

There had been agitation for women's suffrage in Mexico in the late nineteenth century, and both Francisco Madero and Venustiano Carranza were sympathetic to women's issues, both having female private secretaries who influenced their thinking on the matter. Carranza's secretary Hermila Galindo was an important feminist activist, who in collaboration with others founded a feminist magazine La Mujer Moderna that folded in 1919, but until then advocated for women's rights. Mexican feminist Andrea Villarreal was active agitating against the Díaz regime in the Mexican Liberal Party and was involved with La Mujer Moderna, until it ceased publication. She was known as the "Mexican Joan of Arc" and was a woman represented in U.S. artist Judy Chicago's dinner party.

Carranza made changes in family and marital law with long-lasting consequences. In December 1914, he issued a decree that allowed for divorce under certain circumstances. His initial decree was then expanded when he became president in 1916, which in addition to divorce "gave women the right to alimony and to the management of property, and other similar rights."

With the victory of the Constitutionalist faction in the Revolution, a new constitution was drafted in 1917. It was an advanced social document on many grounds, enshrining rights of labor, empowering the state to expropriate natural resources, and expanding the role of the secular state, but it did not grant women the right to vote, since they were still not considered citizens.

During the presidency of Lázaro Cárdenas (1934–40), legislation to give women the right to vote was passed, but not implemented. He had campaigned on a "promise to reform the constitution to grant equal rights." Women did not achieve the right to vote until 1953.

== Women in the Professions ==
=== Politics ===
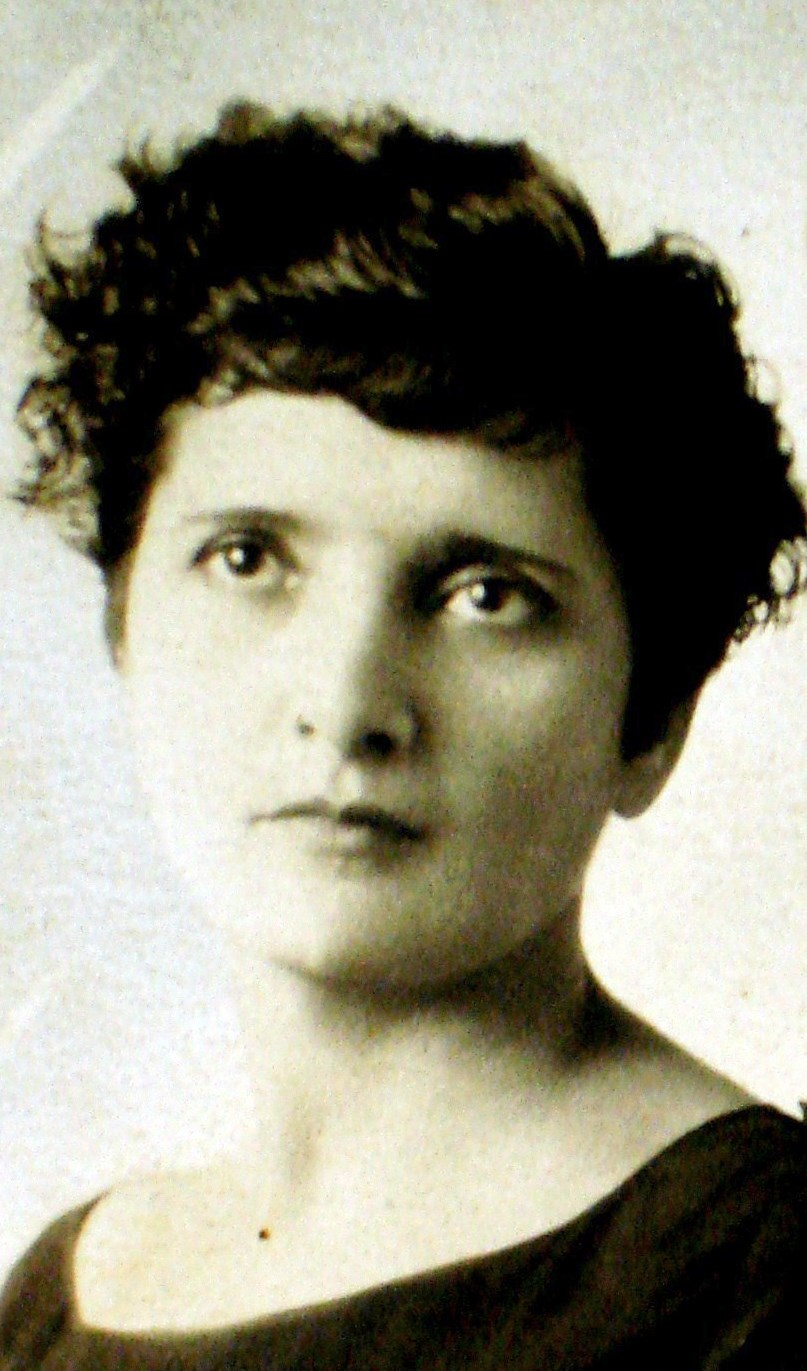
Elvia Carrillo Puerto socialist politician

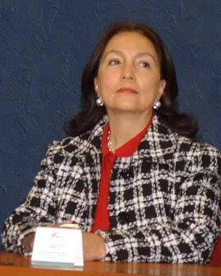
Former governor of Zacatecas.

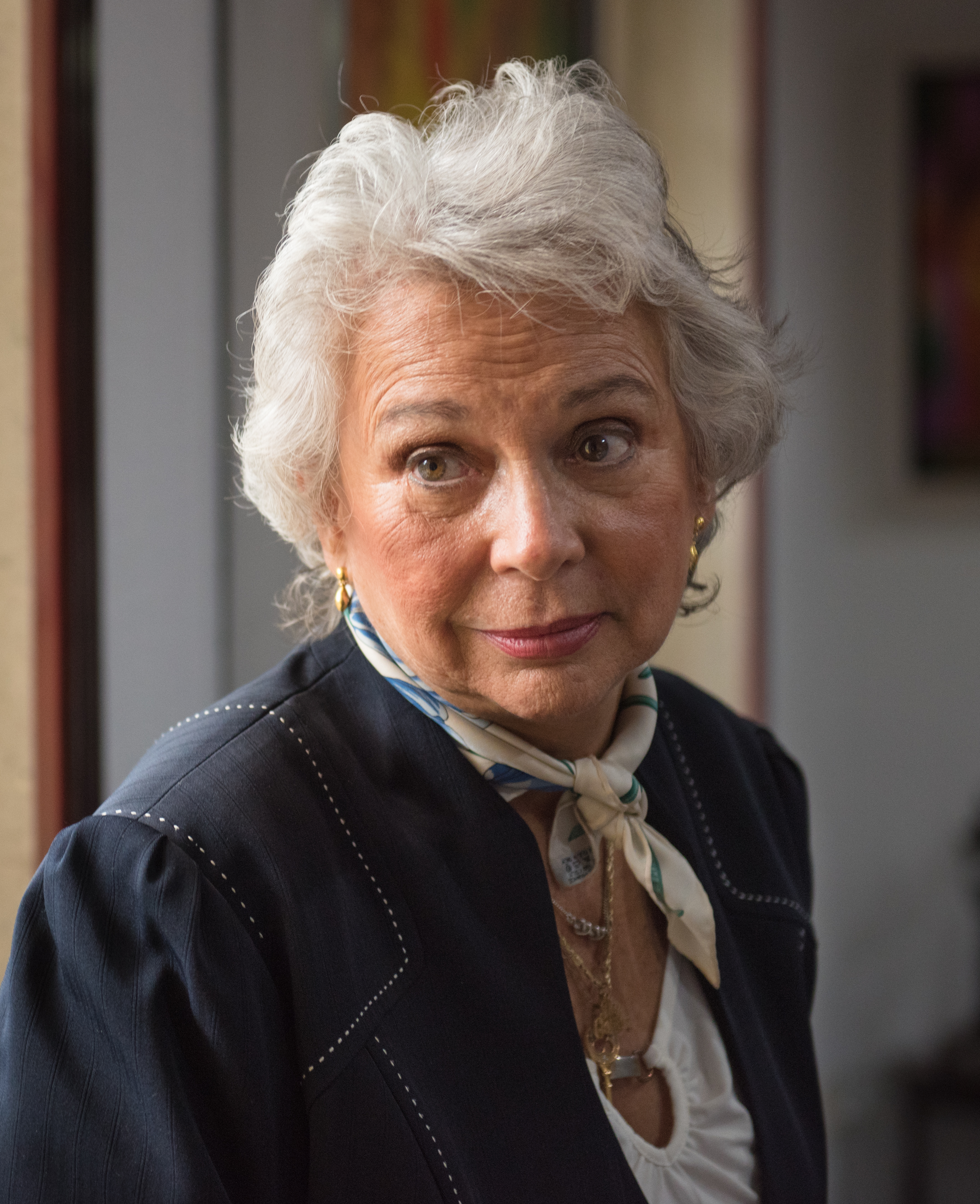
Olga Sanchez Cordero, Minister of the Interior

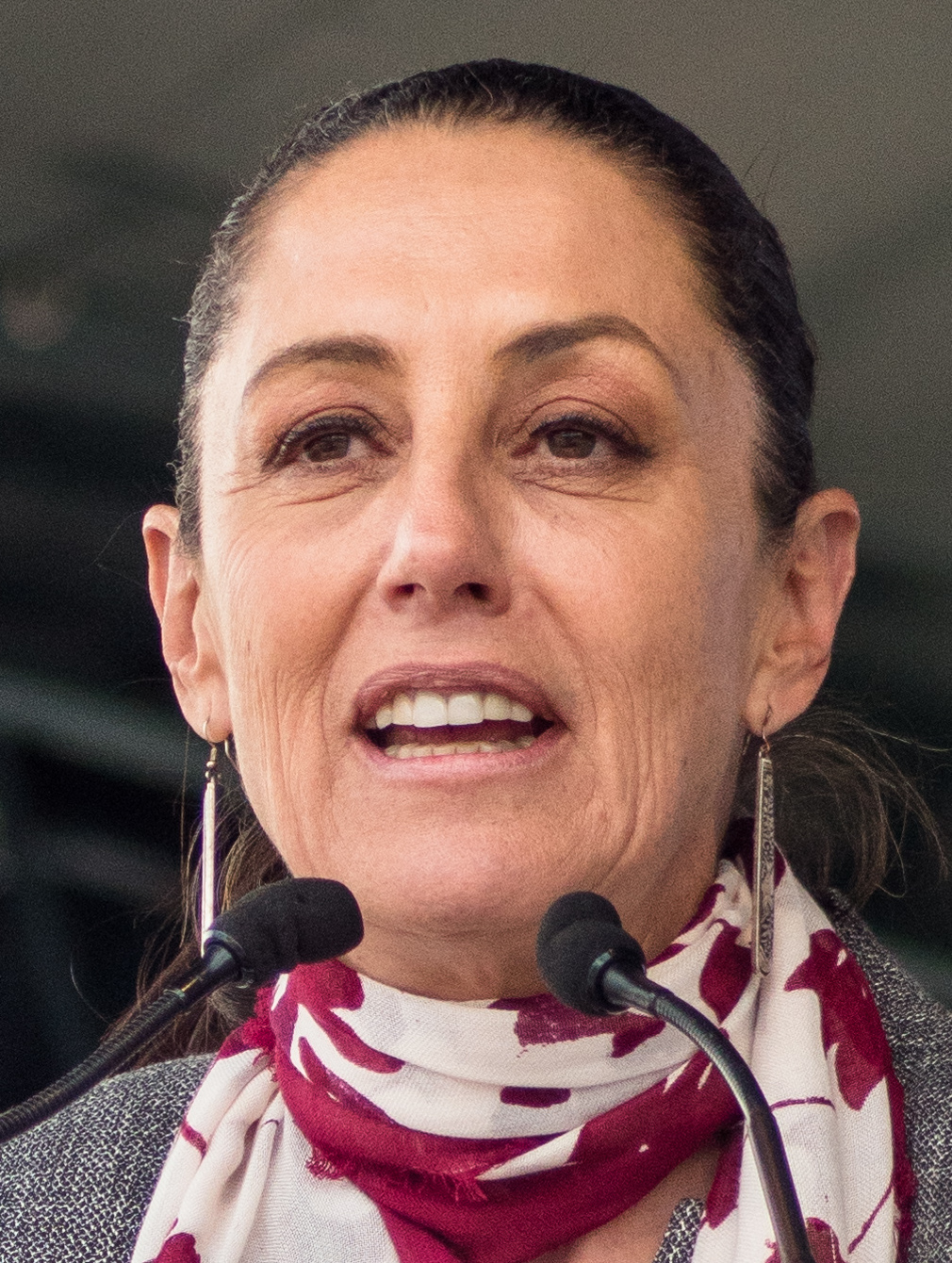
Claudia Sheinbaum Pardo politician, scientist, and academic. Sheinbaum served as Head of Government of Mexico City and the first woman elected president in 2024.

Although women comprise half of the Mexican population, they were historically underrepresented in the highest ranks of political power. They did not achieve the vote nationally until 1953. However, President Porfirio Díaz married Carmen Romero Rubio, the daughter of one of his cabinet ministers, Manuel Romero Rubio; she was an influential First Lady of Mexico during his long presidency, 1881–1911. A few subsequent First Ladies took more visible roles in politics. The wife of President Vicente Fox (2000–2006), Marta Sahagún was an active member of the National Action Party and became the wife of Fox after she had served as his spokesperson. Sahagún was criticized for her political ambitions, and she has stated that she will no longer pursue them. She was seen as undermining Fox's presidency.

A political landmark in Mexico was the election of feminist and socialist Rosa Torre González to the city council of Mérida, Yucatán in 1922, becoming the first woman elected to office in Mexico. The state accorded women the vote shortly after the Mexican Revolution. During the presidency of Ernesto Zedillo (1994–2000), Rosario Green served as the Minister of Foreign Affairs, briefly served as Secretary General of the Institutional Revolutionary Party, and as a Mexican senator. Amalia García became the fifth woman to serve as governor of a Mexican state on September 12, 2004 (Zacatecas 2004–2010). Earlier women governors were Griselda Álvarez (Colima, 1979–1985), Beatriz Paredes (Tlaxcala, 1987–1992), Dulce María Sauri (Yucatán, 1991–1994), Rosario Robles Berlanga (Distrito Federal, 1999–2000). From 1989 to 2013, the head of the Mexican teachers' trade union was Elba Esther Gordillo, considered at one point the most powerful woman in Mexican politics. She was the first and so far only head of the largest union in Latin America; in 2013 she was arrested for corruption and was named by Forbes Magazine as one of the 10 most corrupt Mexicans of 2013. The Minister of Education in the government of Felipe Calderón was Josefina Vázquez Mota, so far the first and only woman to hold the position. She went on to become the presidential candidate for the National Action Party in 2018. First Lady Margarita Zavala wife of the former President of Mexico Felipe Calderón also ran as an independent candidate for the presidency of Mexico between October 12, 2017, and May 16, 2018.

On the left, President Andrés Manuel López Obrador appointed an equal number of women and men to his cabinet when he took office in 2018. These include Olga Sánchez Cordero as Secretary of the Interior, the first woman to hold the high office. Other women in his cabinet are Graciela Márquez Colín, Secretary of the Economy; Luisa María Alcalde Luján, Secretary of Labor and Social Welfare; Irma Eréndira Sandoval, Secretary of Public Administration; Alejandra Frausto Guerrero, Secretary of Culture; Rocío Nahle García, Secretary of Energy; María Luisa Albores González, Secretary of Social Development; and Josefa González Blanco Ortiz Mena, Secretary of the Environment and Natural Resources. Claudia Sheinbaum was elected mayor of Mexico City as a candidate for the National Regeneration Movement (MORENA) party, the first woman elected to the post;, though Rosario Robles had previously served as interim mayor.

Since October 1, 2024, Claudia Sheinbaum has served as the first woman president of Mexico.

=== Women intellectuals, journalists, and writers ===
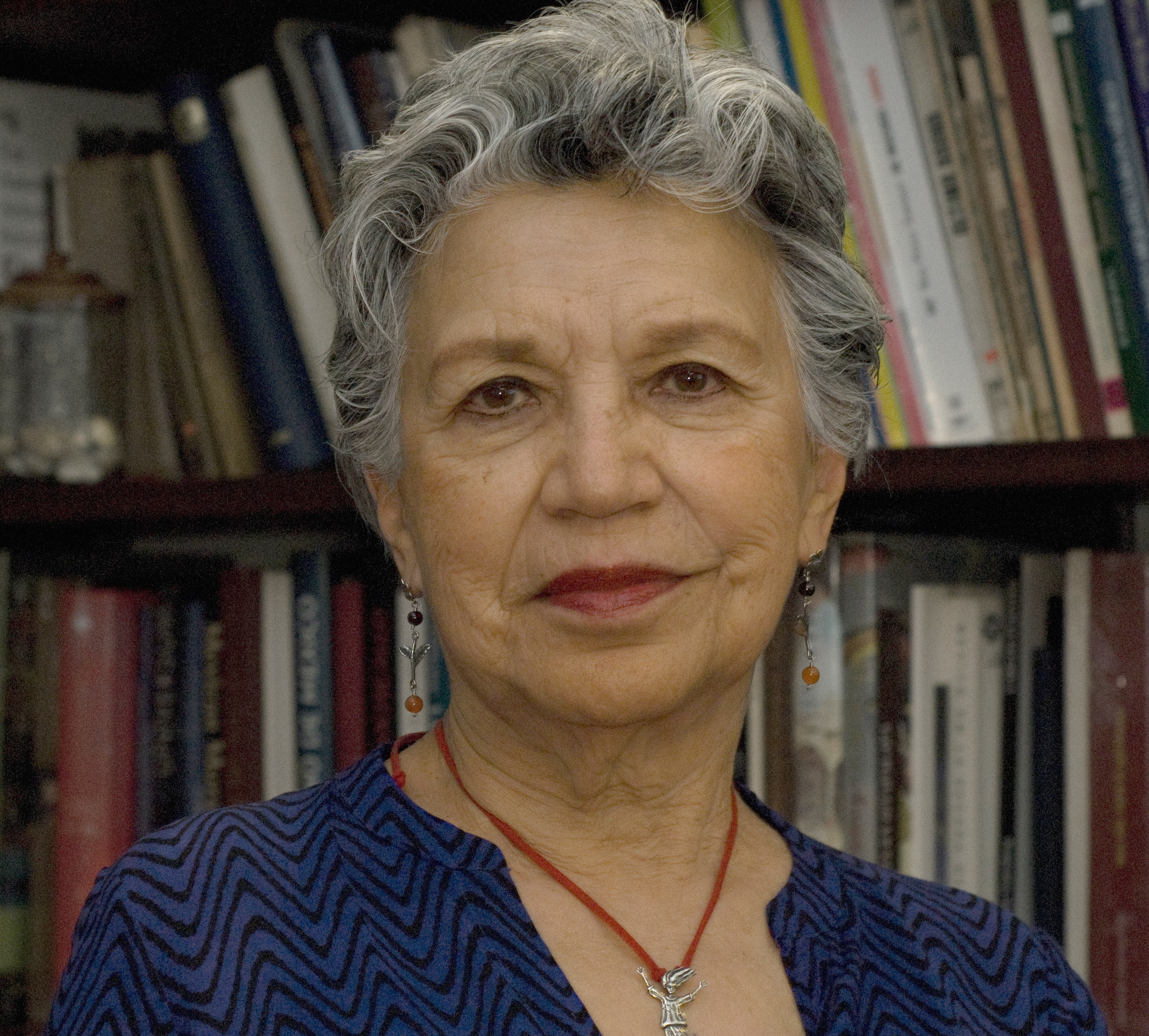
Silvia Torres-Peimbert is the first Mexican woman to receive her doctorate in astronomy.

Eulalia Guzmán participated in the Mexican Revolution and then taught in a rural primary school and was the first woman archeologist in Mexico. Her identification of human bones as those of Aztec emperor Cuauhtémoc brought her to public attention. Rosario Castellanos was a distinguished twentieth-century feminist novelist, poet, and author of other works, a number of which have been translated to English. At the time of her death at 49, she was Mexican ambassador to Israel. Novelist Laura Esquivel (Like Water for Chocolate) has served in the Mexican Chamber of Deputies for the Morena Party. Other women writers have distinguished themselves nationally and internationally in the modern era, including Anita Brenner, and Guadalupe Loaeza. Some writers were mestiza women who began to publish their own journals in the 1870s. They were able to help form a rhetoric around the mestiza that allowed them all to have a platform for the formation of their own national identity. They were able to write and use their platform as women in journalism to get their fight across the nation.

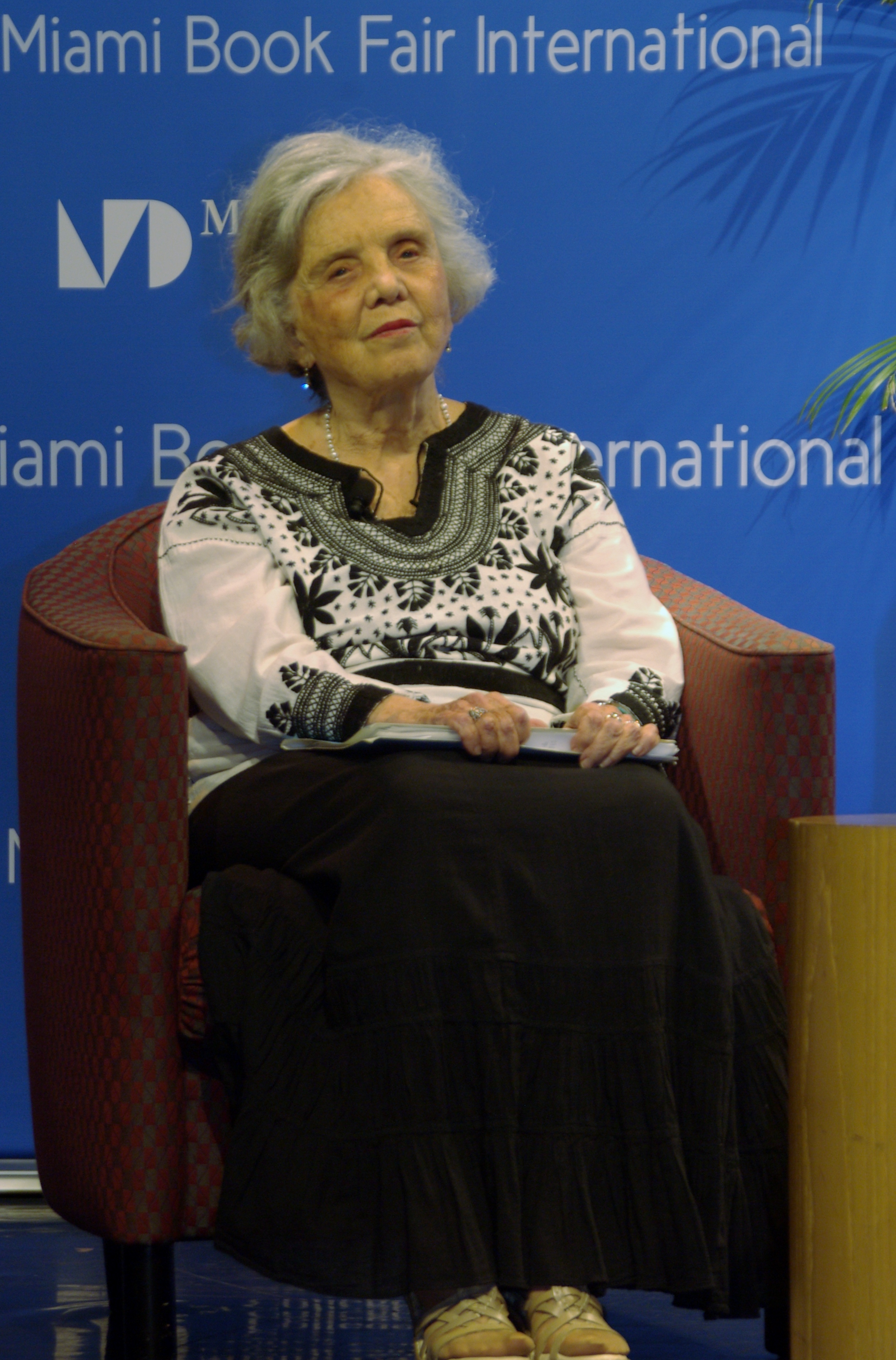
Princess of Poland Elena Poniatowska, journalist and essayist

The most famous woman writer and intellectual was seventeenth-century nun, Sor Juana Inés de la Cruz. "Today, Sor Juana stands as a national icon of Mexican identity, and her image appears on Mexican currency. She came to new prominence in the late 20th century with the rise of feminism and women's writing, ... credited as the first published feminist of the New World." A number of women have become distinguished intellectuals in modern Mexico, especially Elena Poniatowska, whose reportage on the Tlatelolco Massacre of 1968 and the 1995 Mexico City earthquake have been important. Historian Virginia Guedea has specialized in the history of independence-era Mexico.

Many Mexican journalists have been murdered since the 1980s, including a number of Mexican women. In 1986, Norma Alicia Moreno Figueroa was the first woman journalist identified as a murder victim of the Mexican drug war. Broadcast crime reporter Dolores Guadalupe García Escamilla was murdered in 2005. Yolanda Figueroa was murdered in the drug war, along with her journalist husband, Fernando Balderas Sánchez, and children in 1996. In 2009, Michoacan journalist María Esther Aguilar Cansimbe disappeared. Former TV journalist at Televisa, María Isabella Cordero was murdered in Chihuahua in 2010. In Veracruz in 2011, crime reporter Yolanda Ordaz de la Cruz was killed. Marisol Macías was murdered in Nuevo Laredo by the Los Zetas in 2011.

=== Women in the arts ===
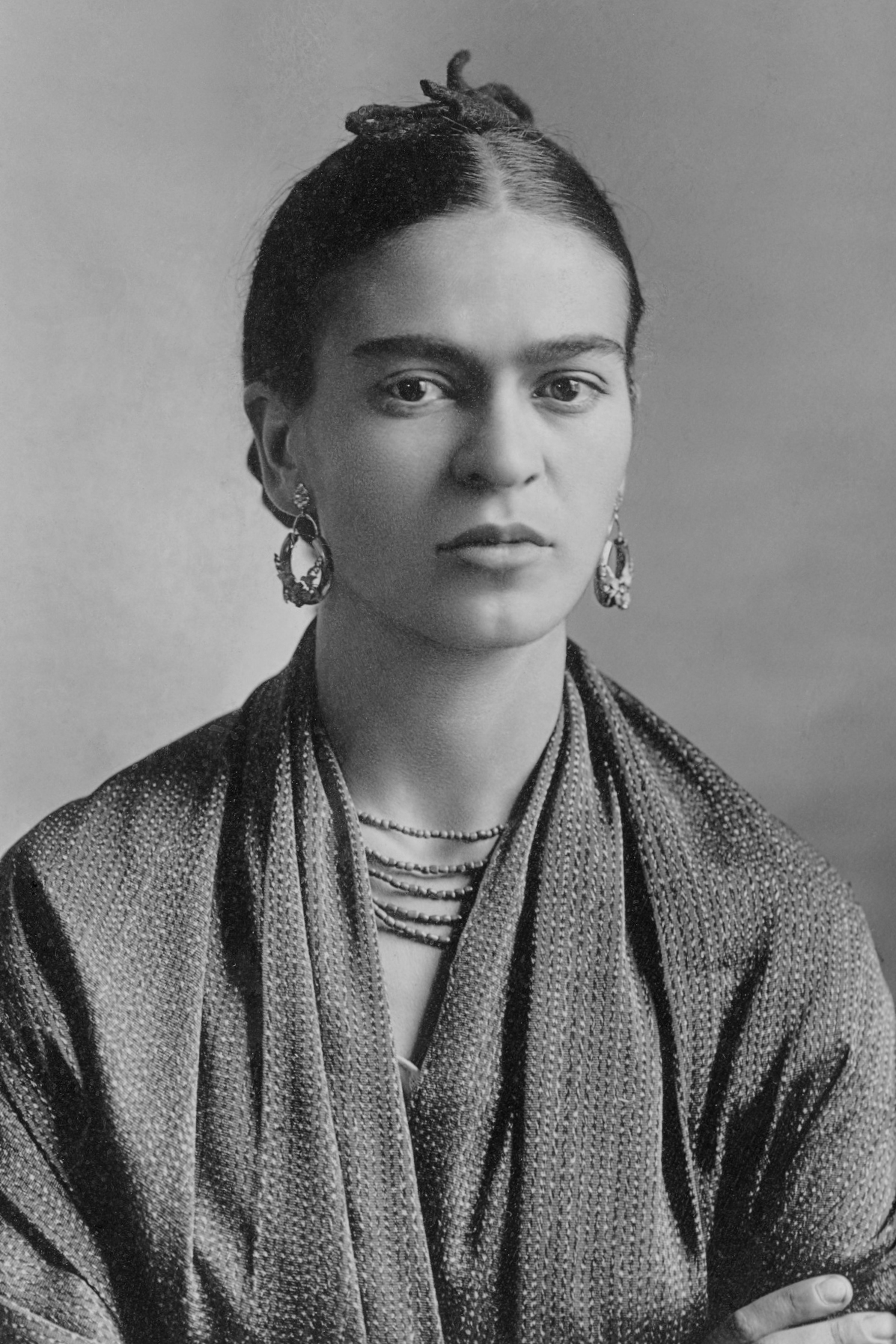
Frida Kahlo

Painter Frida Kahlo, daughter of photographer Guillermo Kahlo and spouse to muralist Diego Rivera, is revered for her evocative self-portraits. Her oeuvre reflects themes of identity, pain, and cultural heritage.

The artistic career of Mexican muralist María Izquierdo is often juxtaposed with that of her contemporary, Kahlo. Carmen Mondragón, also known as Nahui Olin, was a painter, poet, and muse during the early 20th century. Muralist and scenic designer Lola Cueto derived inspiration from Mexican folk art and indigenous cultural motifs.

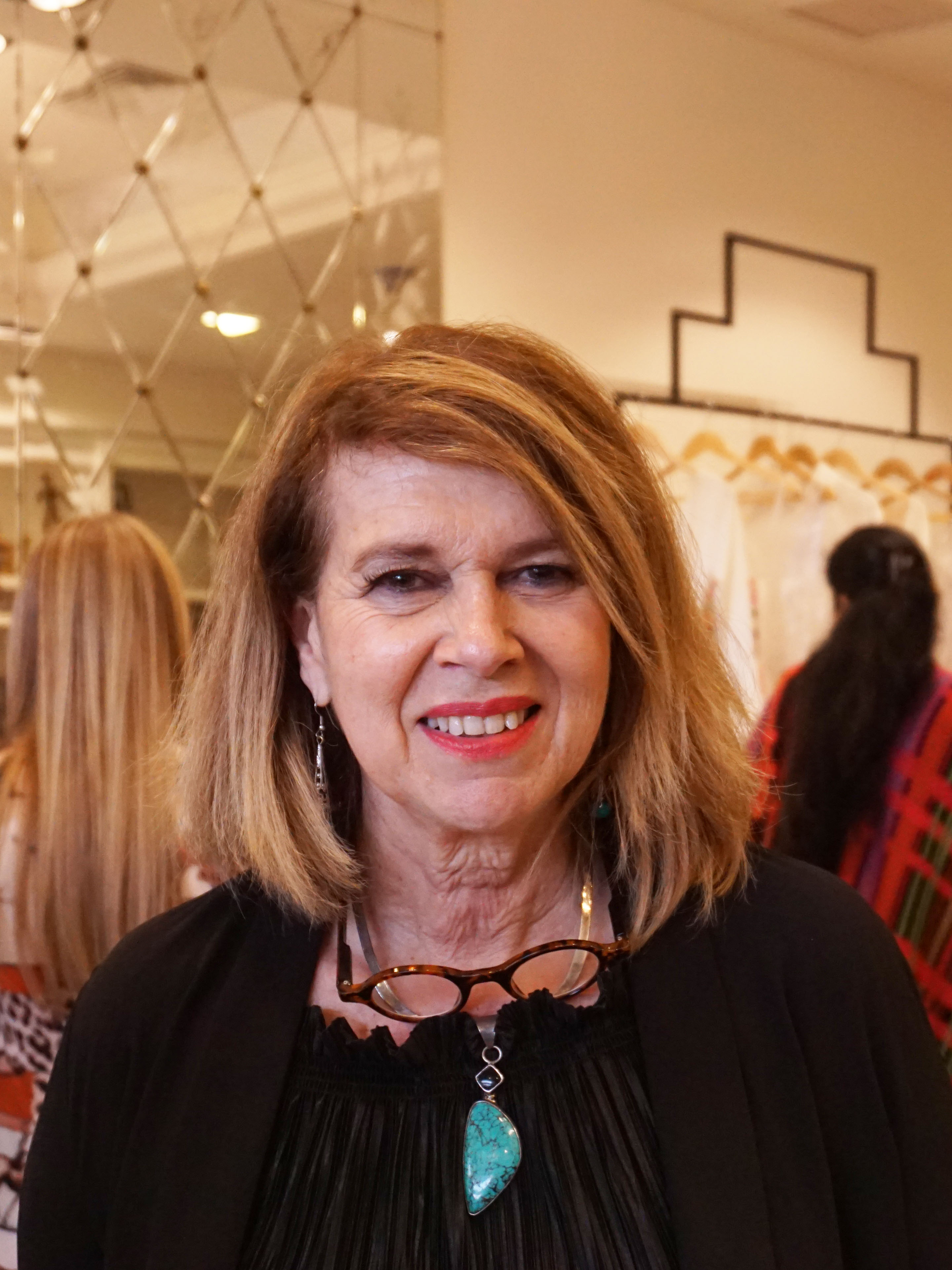
Lydia Lavin, a researcher, professor and Mexican fashion designer.

Amongst contemporary Mexican artists, Ángela Gurría was the first woman elected to the Academia de Artes (Academy of Arts). Carmen Parra's artistic oeuvre explored social and political concerns, particularly advocating for women's rights through her work. Verónica Ruiz de Velasco's paintings frequently explored themes of nature, spirituality, and Mexican culture.

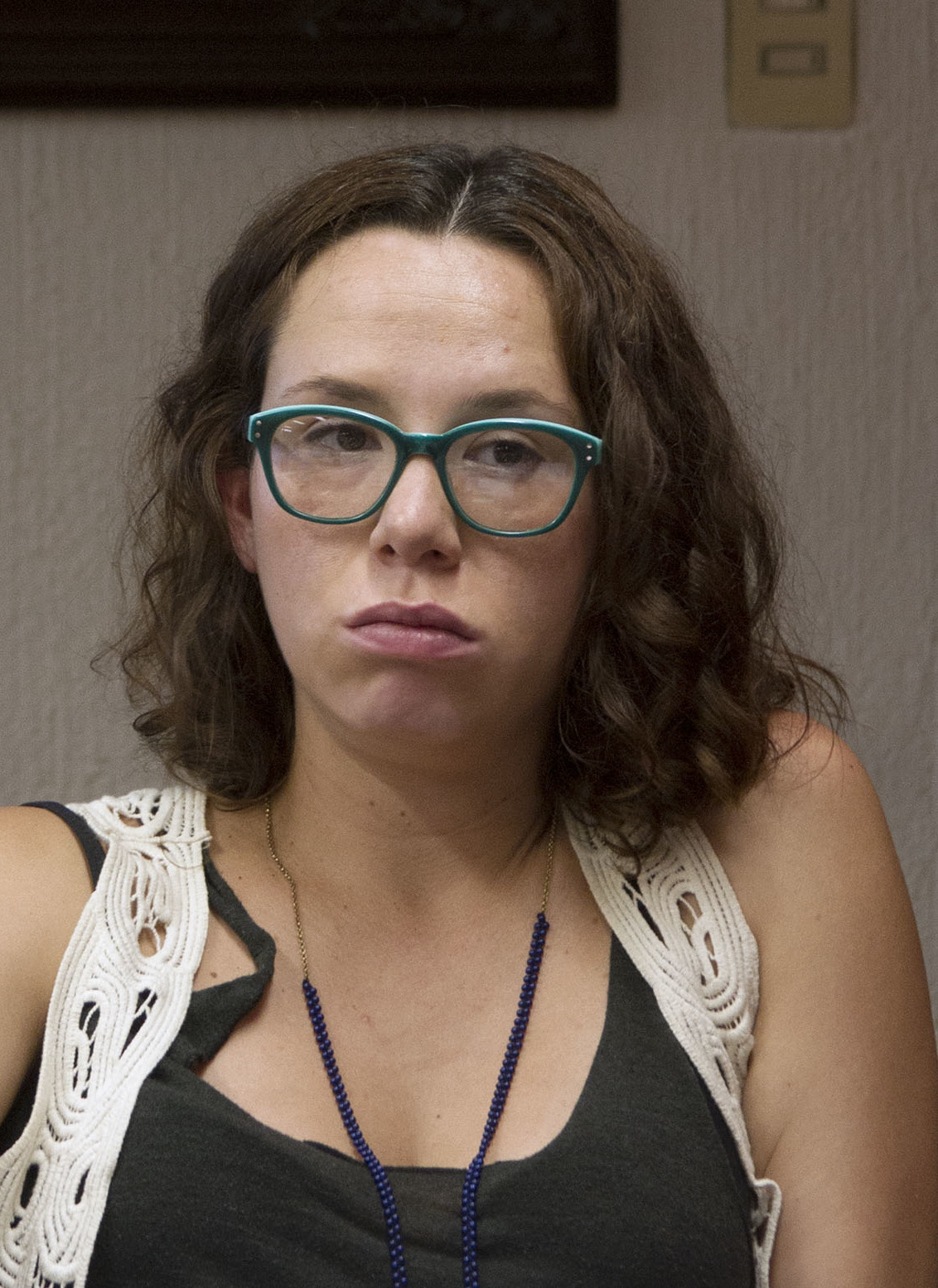
Natalia Beristáin's 2017 film The Eternal Feminine was praised for its portrayal of the Mexican poet Rosario Castellanos and her struggles against gender expectations in the mid-20th century.

Amalia Hernández established the Ballet Folklórico de México, a dance ensemble that performs at the Palace of Fine Arts in Mexico City. Google celebrated Hernández on the anniversary of her 100th birthday.

Dolores del Río is one of the earliest Latin American film actresses to achieve widespread international acclaim. María Félix, affectionately known as "La Doña," flourished during the Golden Age of Mexican cinema. Silvia Pinal became a prominent film, theater, and television actress, while Verónica Castro starred in telenovelas.

Contemporary Mexican actress Salma Hayek emerged as a multifaceted performer with global recognition. Conversely, Indigenous Oaxaca actress Yalitza Aparicio starred in Alfonso Cuarón's film Roma. Meanwhile, Eiza González became a prominent performer with international acclaim.

=== Architecture ===
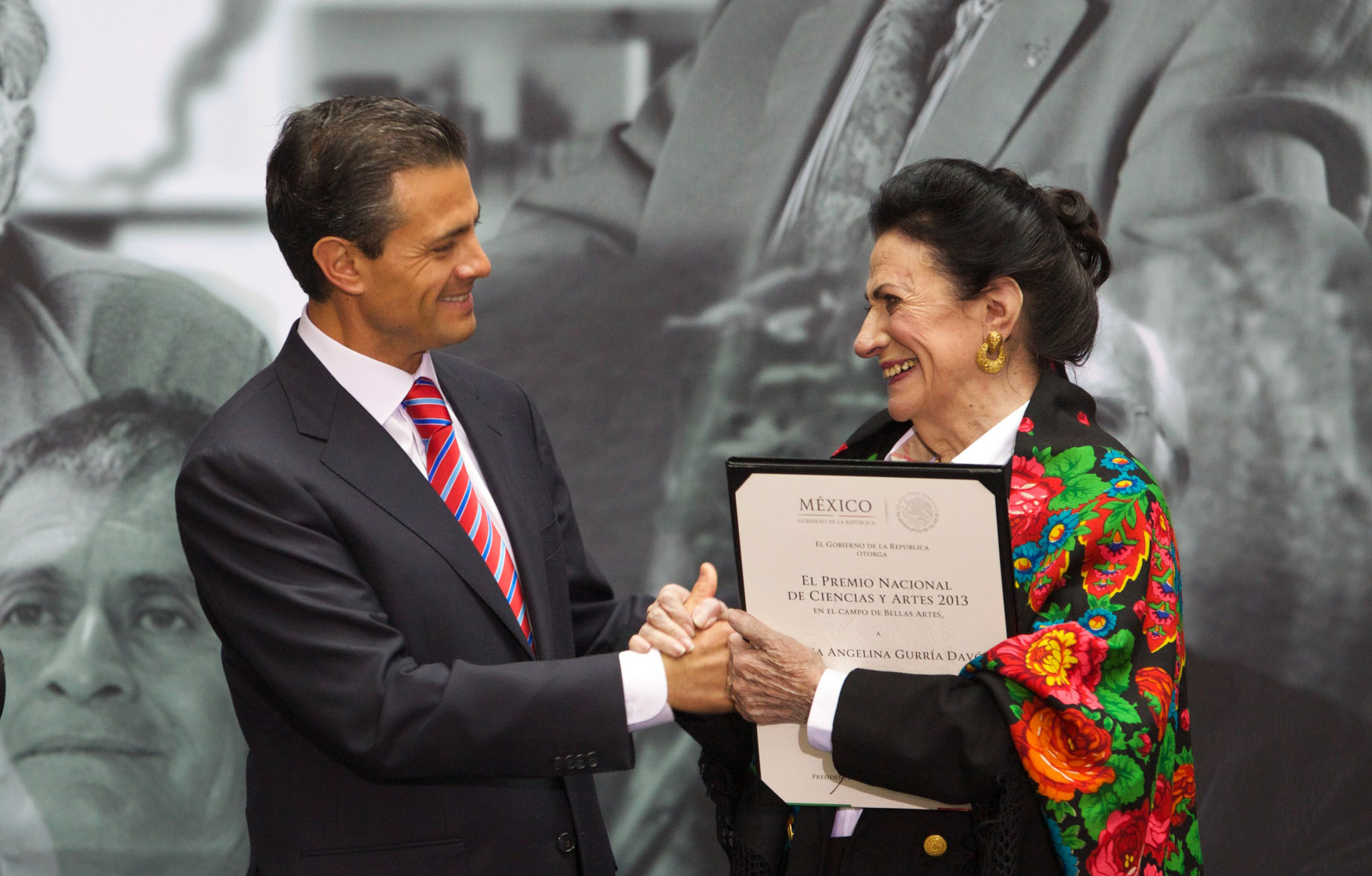
Ángela Gurría

Mexican women have made significant advancements in the field of architecture.

The first prominent woman architect in Mexico was Ruth Rivera Marin (1927–1969). She was the daughter of Diego Rivera and Guadalupe Marín Preciado. Rivera was the first woman to study architecture at the College of Engineering and Architecture of the National Polytechnic Institute. She focused primarily on teaching architectural theory and practice and was the head of the Architecture Department at the Instituto Nacional de Bellas Artes from 1959 to 1969. After her father's death, she worked with Mexican architects Juan O'Gorman and Heriberto Pagelson to complete the Anahuacalli Museum in Coyoacán.

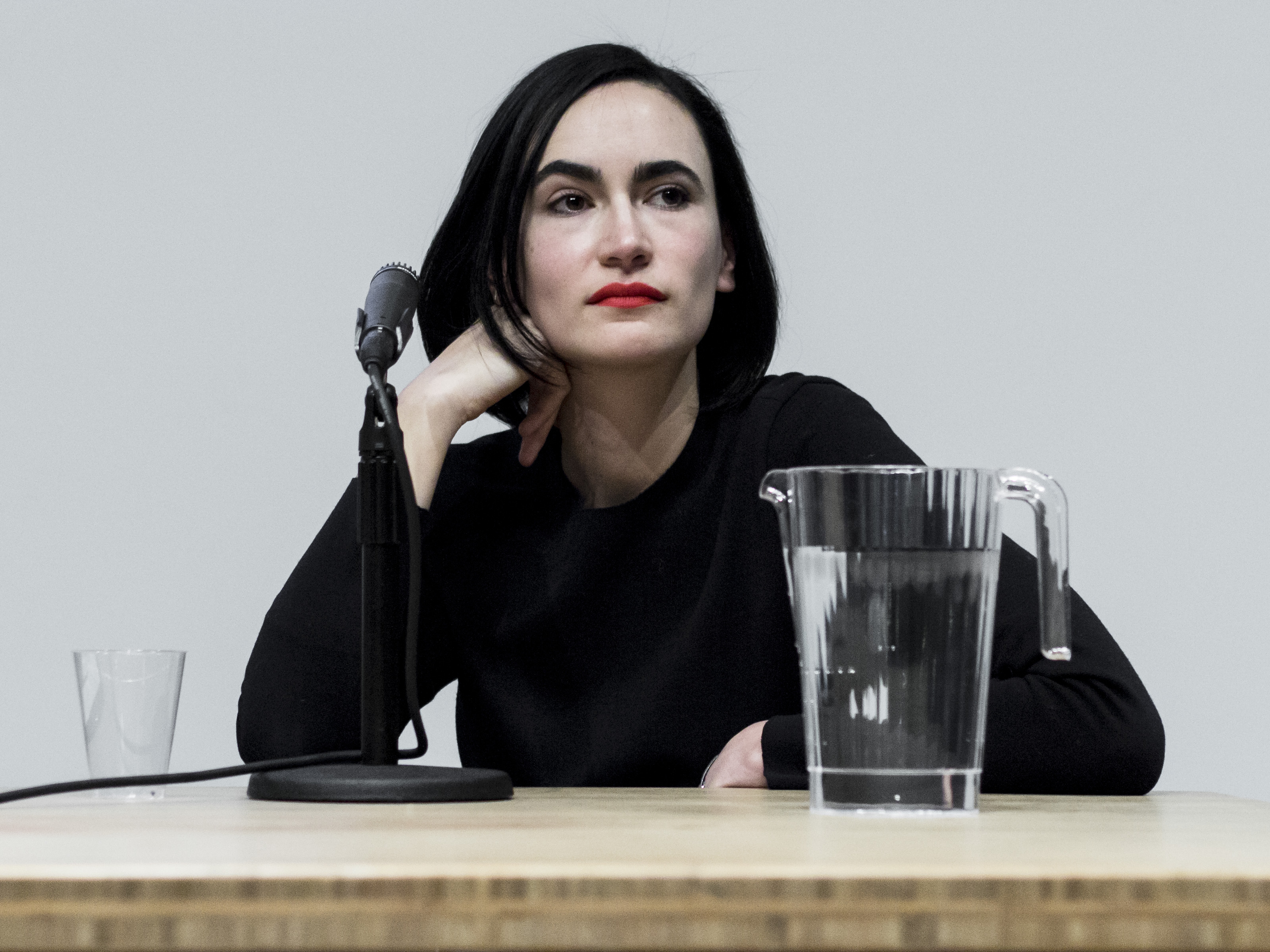
Frida Escobedo

In the early twenty-first century, Mexico has had several important women architects at the forefront of architectural innovation. Sustainability, balance, and integration with nature have been important motifs in their works. Beatriz Peschard Mijares' ultra-luxury modernist projects balance minimalist structures with their surrounding landscapes. This aim of functionalist balance is rooted in Peschard's own personal struggles balancing “family life, being a mother, and her work” as an architect. A major proponent of experimentation in Mexican architecture, Peschard stated in 2017 that it's important to “invent new things, not to copy either the Mexican or the foreigner... [but to] search our history and combine what we find with technological and technical advances to create something personal and innovative.”

Another prominent 21st-century Mexico City architect, Tatiana Bilbao (1972) has designed several buildings which merge geometry with nature. Her practice has largely focused on sustainable design and social housing. Bilbao was born in Mexico City into a family of architects, and she studied architecture at the Universidad Iberoamericana. Bilbao is a strong advocate of architectural social justice, and many of her projects have sought to create low-cost housing to address Mexico's affordable housing crisis.

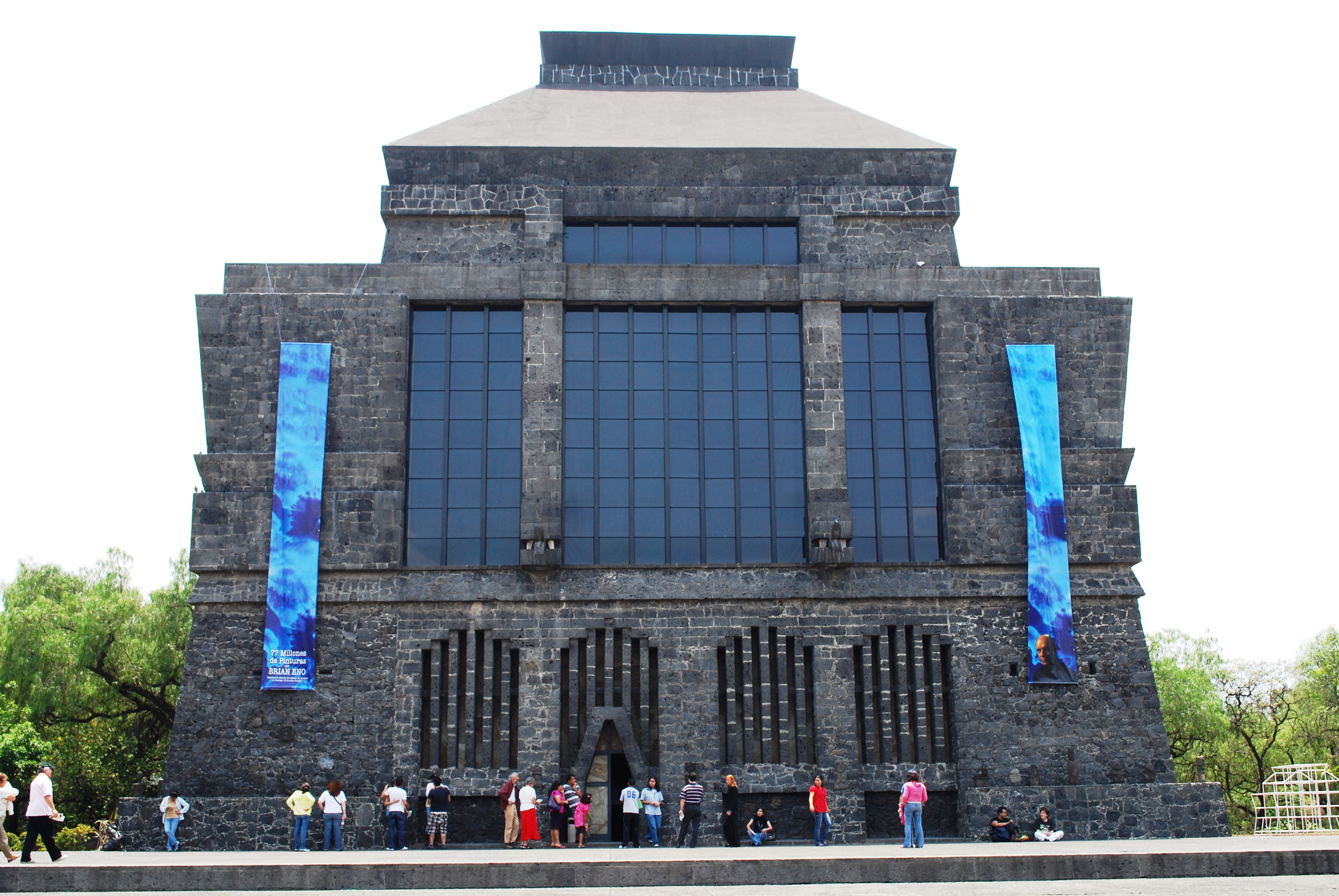
Ruth Rivera Marin: Anahuacalli Museum (1964)

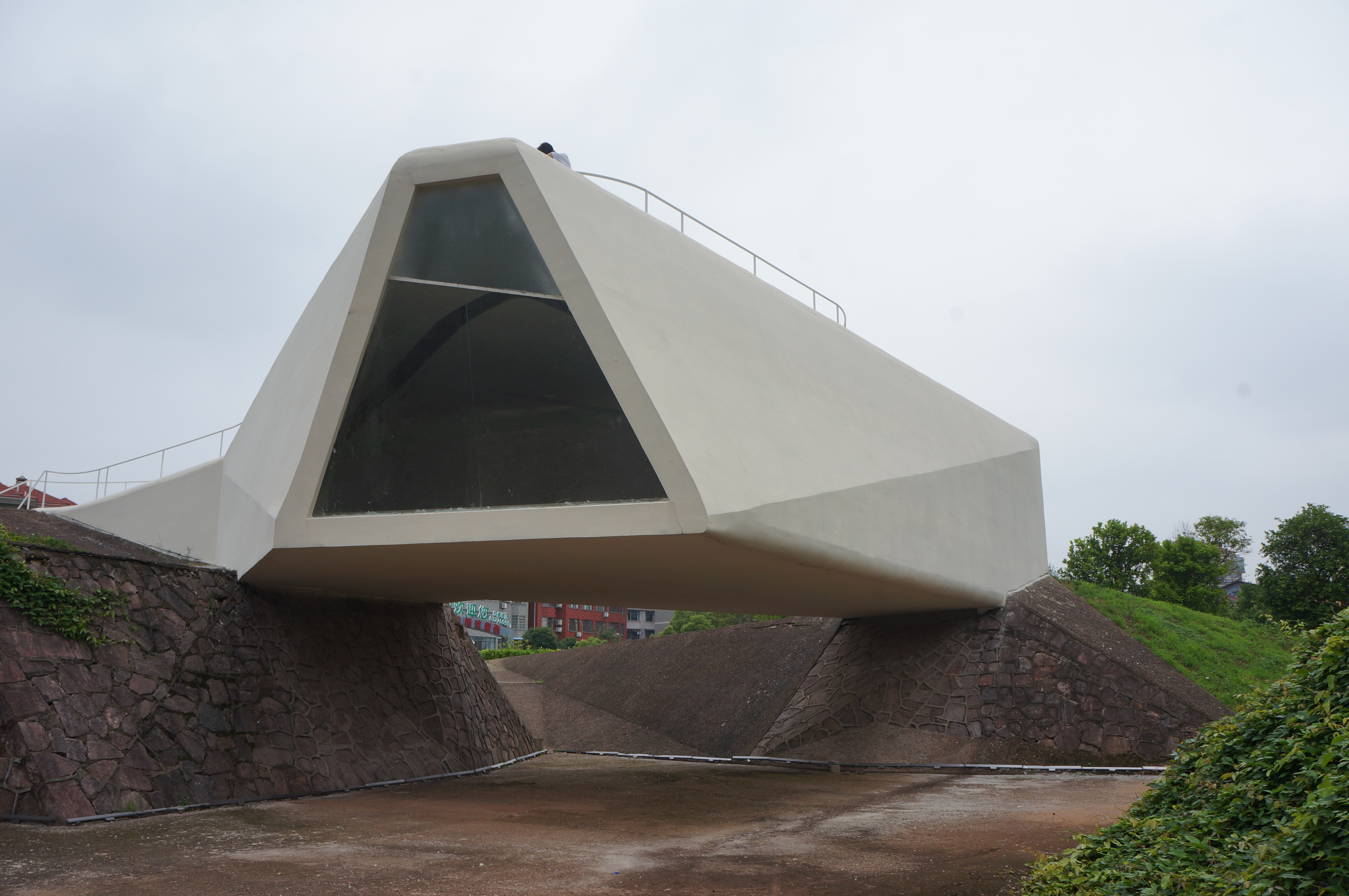
Tatiana Bilbao: Exhibition Room in Jinhua Architecture Park (2004)

== Contemporary issues ==
=== Labor rights ===
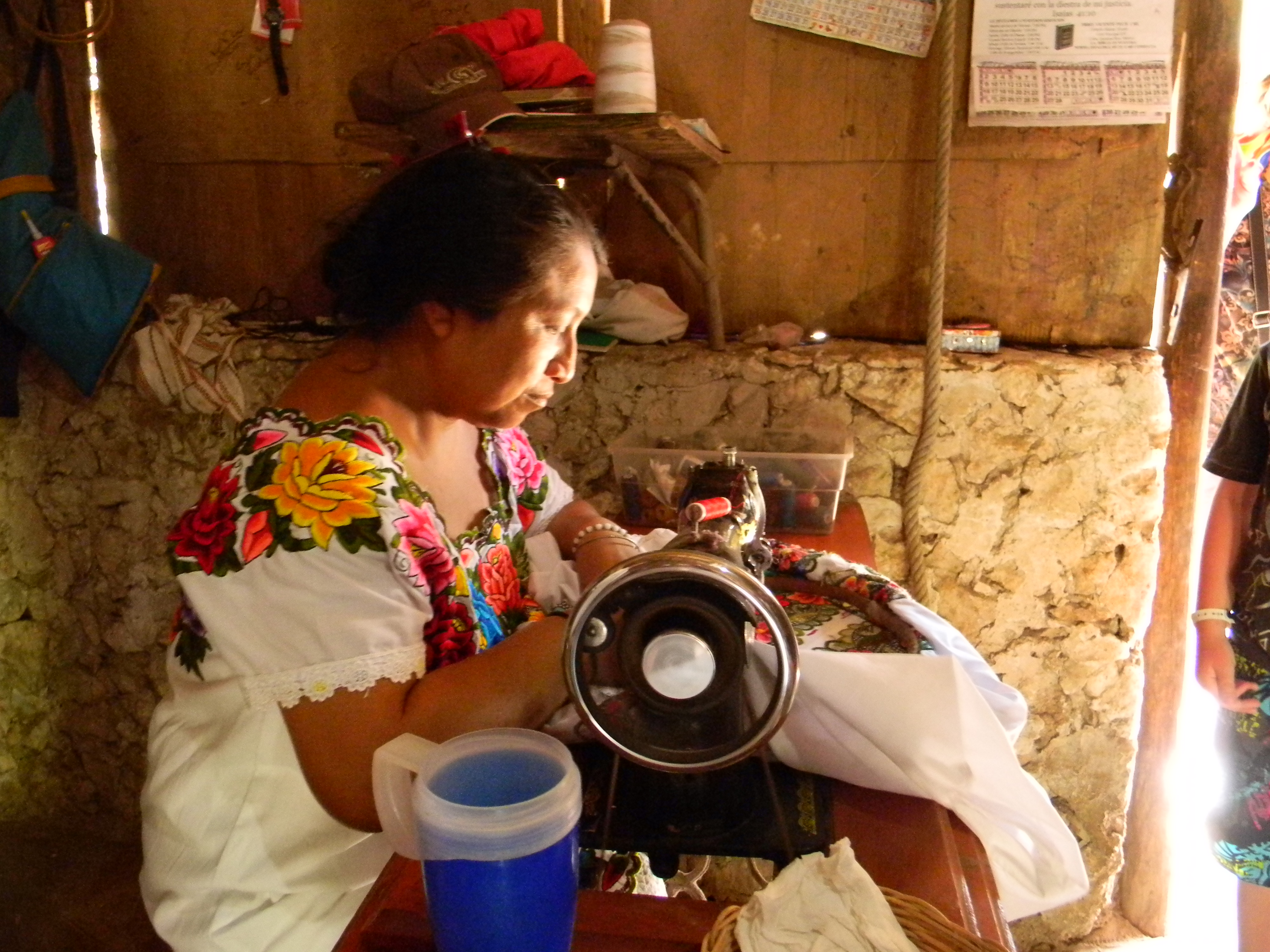
A Maya woman, souvenir maker.

Many women in the workforce do not have legal protections, especially domestic workers. In 2019, President Andrés Manuel López Obrador signed into law protections and benefits for domestic workers, including access to health care and limits on hours of work. The legislation comes after years of activism, including that by Marcelina Bautista, who founded SINACTRAHO, Mexico's first domestic workers union, in 2015. Awareness of the issue got a boost from the 2018 film Roma by Alfonso Cuarón, whose main character is an indigenous female domestic servant. Enforcement of the legislation will be a challenge, since costs to employers will significantly increase.

=== Violence against women ===
As of 2012, Mexico has the 16th highest rate of homicides committed against women in the world. In the first 4 months of 2020 987 women and girls were murdered. Approximately 10 women are killed every day in Mexico, and the rate of femicide has doubled in the last 5 years.

According to the 2013 Human Rights Watch, many women do not seek out legal redress after being victims of domestic violence and sexual assault because "the severity of punishments for some sexual offenses are contingent on the "chastity" of the victim and "those who do report them are generally met with suspicion, apathy, and disrespect."

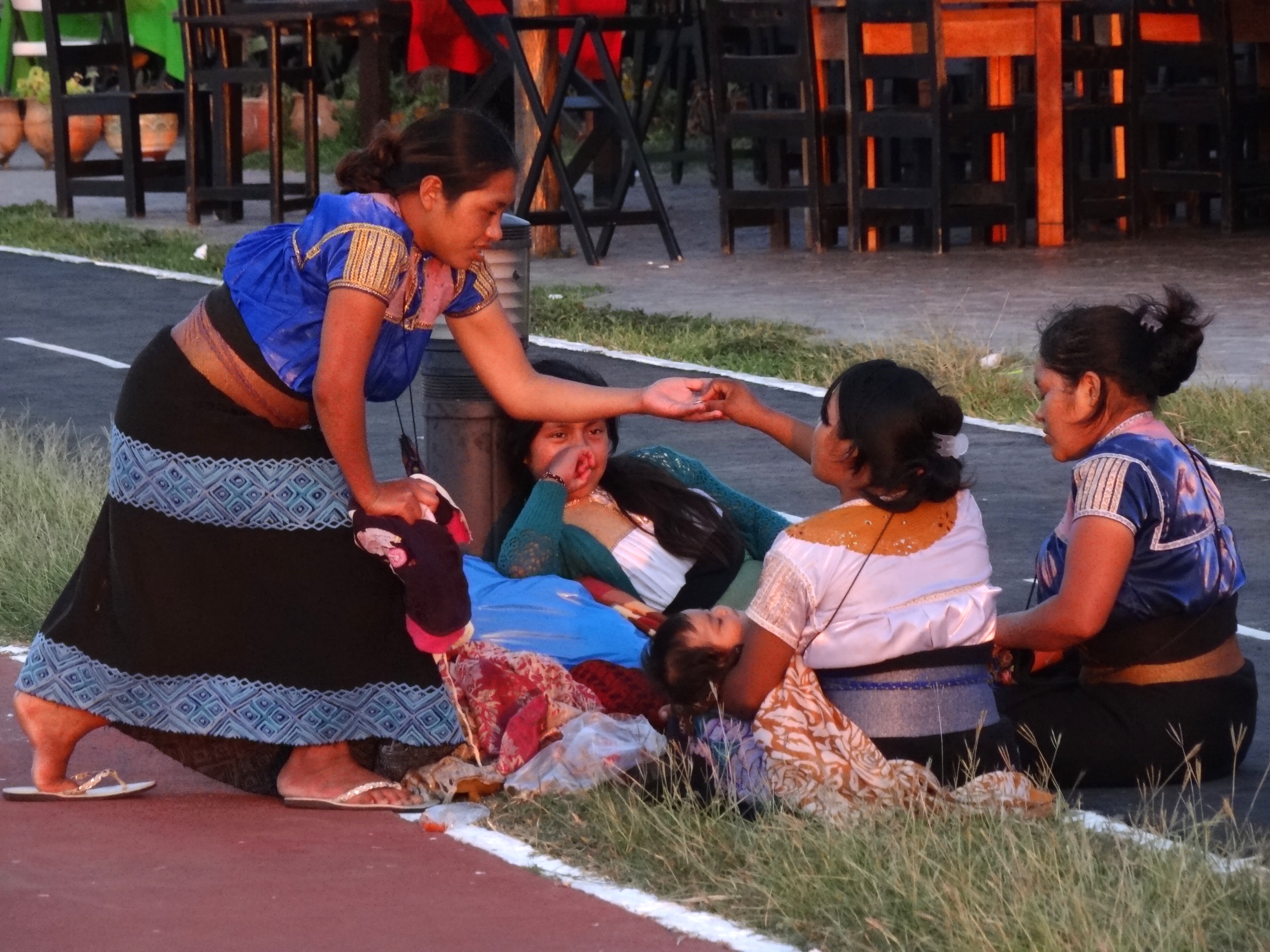
A Mayan family by the roadside, 2012.

According to a 1997 study by Kaja Finkler, domestic abuse is more prevalent in Mexican society as women are dependent on their spouses for subsistence and self esteem, caused by the embedded societal ideology of romantic love, family structure, and residential arrangements.

Mexican women are at risk for HIV infection because they often are unable to negotiate condom use. According to published research by Olivarrieta and Sotelo (1996) and others, the prevalence of domestic violence against women in Mexican marital relationships varies at between 30 and 60 percent of relationships. In this context, requesting condom use with a stable partner is perceived as a sign of infidelity and asking to use a condom can result in domestic violence.

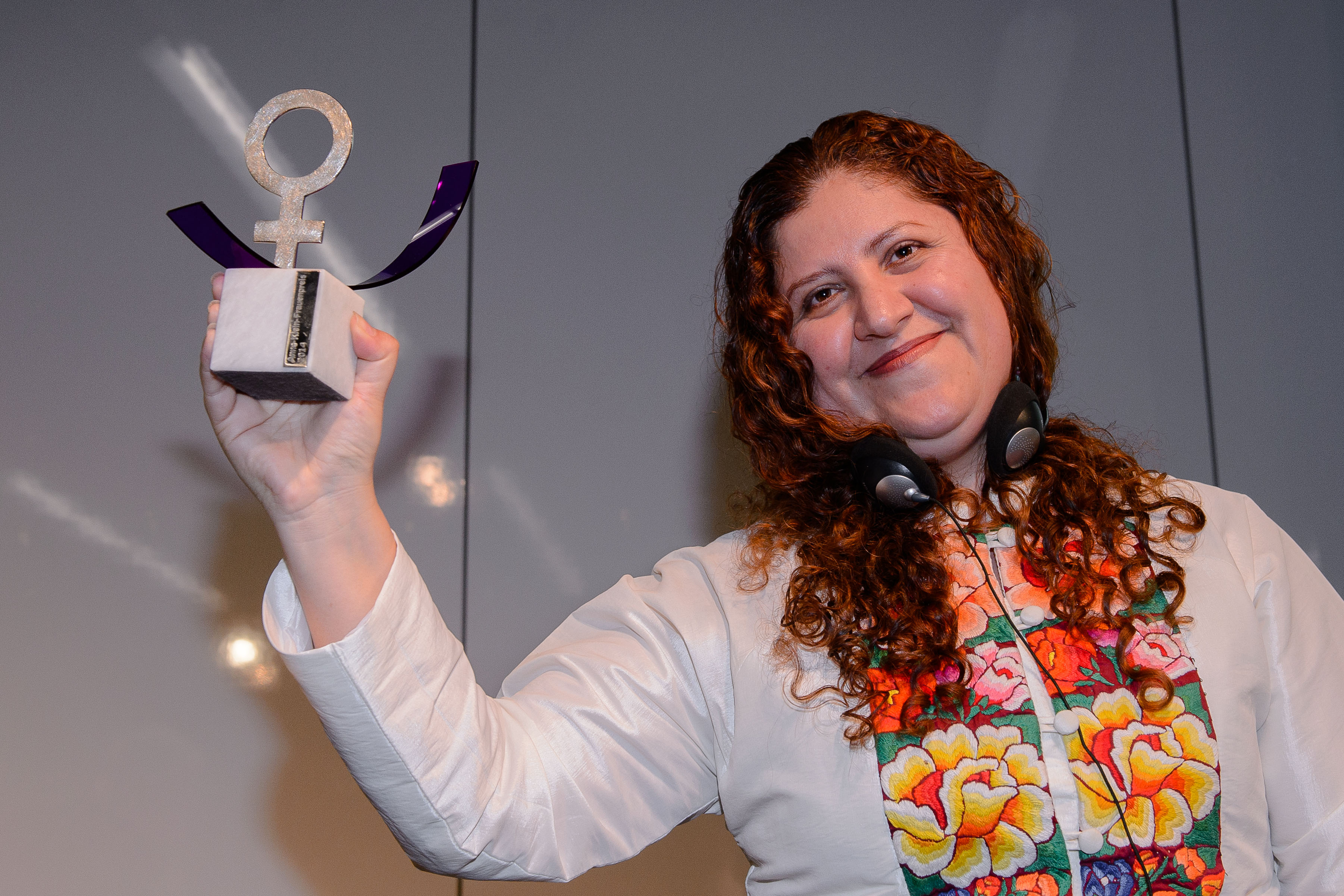
Imelda Marrufo receiving the Anne Klein prize in 2014.

In Mexico City, the area of Iztapalapa has the highest rates of rape, violence against women, and domestic violence in the capital.

Gender violence is more prevalent in regions along the Mexico-US border and in areas of high drug trading activity and drug violence. The phenomenon of the female homicides in Ciudad Juárez involves the violent deaths of hundreds of women and girls since 1993 in the northern Mexican region of Ciudad Juárez, Chihuahua, a border city across the Rio Grande from the U.S. city of El Paso, Texas. As of February 2005, the number of murdered women in Ciudad Juarez since 1993 is estimated to be more than 370. The civic organization Nuestras Hijas de Regreso a Casa A.C. was founded by Norma Andrade in Ciudad Juárez. Her daughter was one of the rape and murder victims. Andrade was subsequently attacked twice by assailants. In November 2019, Mexico vowed to stop gender-based violence as new statistics showed killings of women rose more than 10% in 2018.

Women in the Mexican drug war (2006–present) have been raped, tortured, and murdered in the conflict. They have also been victims of sex trafficking in Mexico.

=== Contraception ===
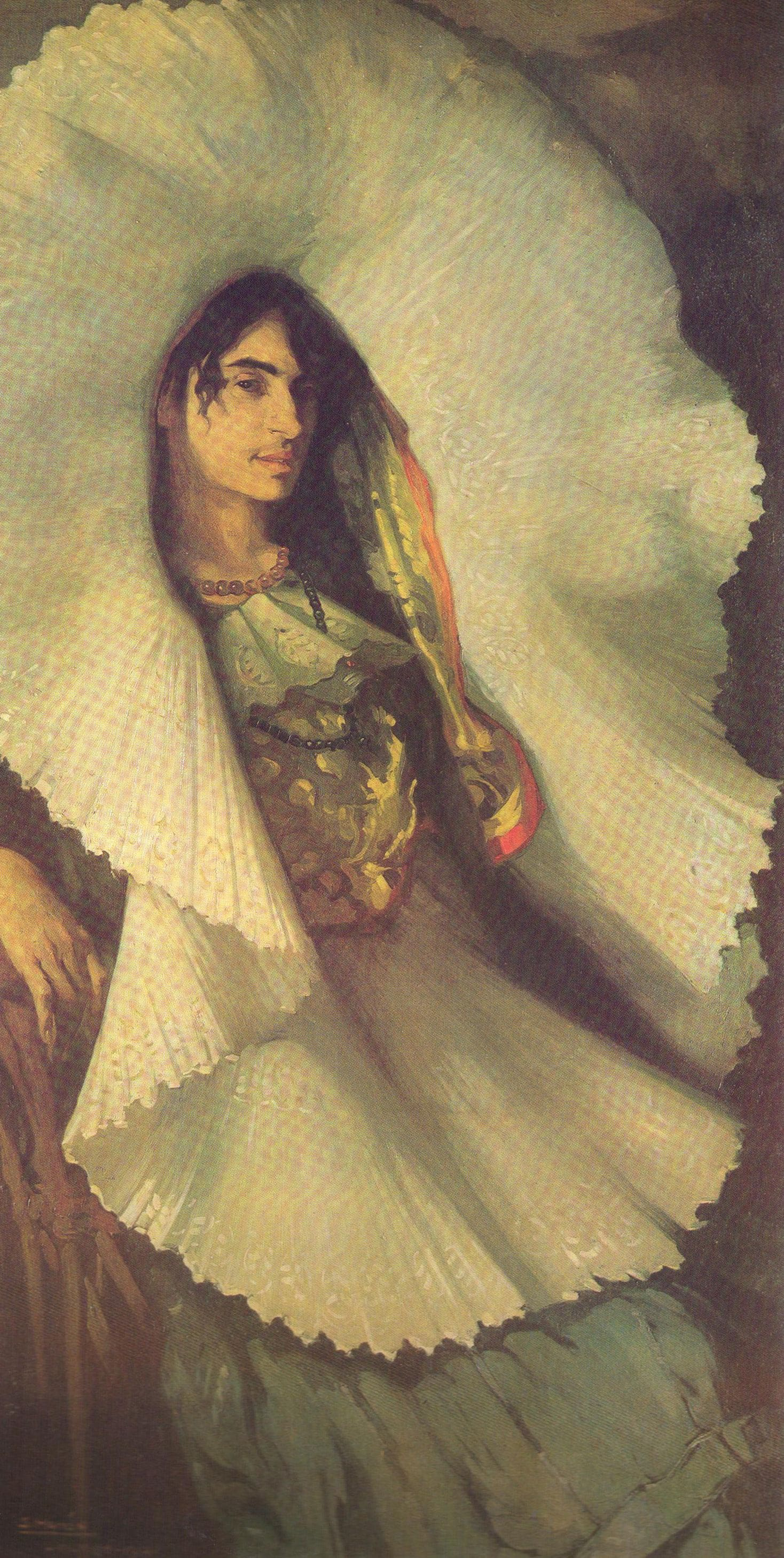
Saturnino Herrán Mujer en Tehuantepec ("Woman of Tehuantepec") 1914

Even as late as the 1960s, the use of contraceptives was prohibited by civil law, but there were private clinics where elite women could access care.

Surging birthrates in Mexico in the 1960s and 70s became a political issue, particularly as agriculture was less productive and Mexico was no longer self-sufficient in food. As Mexico became more urban and industrialized, the government formulated and implemented family planning policies in the 1970s and 80s that aimed at educating Mexicans about the advantages of controlling fertility. A key component of the educational campaign was the creation of telenovelas (soap operas) that conveyed the government's message about the virtues of family planning. Mexico pioneered the use of soap operas to shape public attitudes on sensitive issues in a format both accessible and enjoyable to a wide range of viewers. Mexico's success in reducing the increase of its population has been the subject of scholarly study.

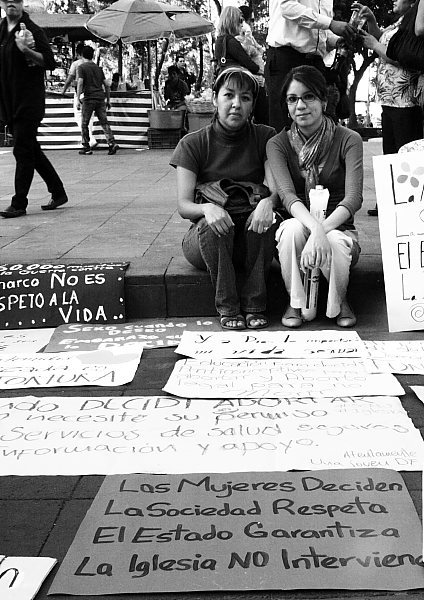
Women campaigning for the decriminalisation of abortion in 2011.

One scholar, the Stanford University historian Ana Raquel Minion, has attributed at least part of Mexico's success to forced sterilization programs. In her 2018 text Undocumented Lives, she writes:

"After the new Ley General of 1974 passed, some medical authorities in public health care institutions responded to the growing pressures to lower birth rates by forcibly sterilizing working-class women immediately after they delivered via cesarean section. Because most of these cases went undetected and undenounced, their exact number is unknown. However, a governmental study performed in 1987 found staggering results. Ten percent of the women in the national sample claimed to have been sterilized without having been asked; 25 percent affirmed they were not informed that sterilization was an irreversible method of birth control or that other options existed; and 70 percent declared that they had been sterilized immediately after giving birth or having an abortion."

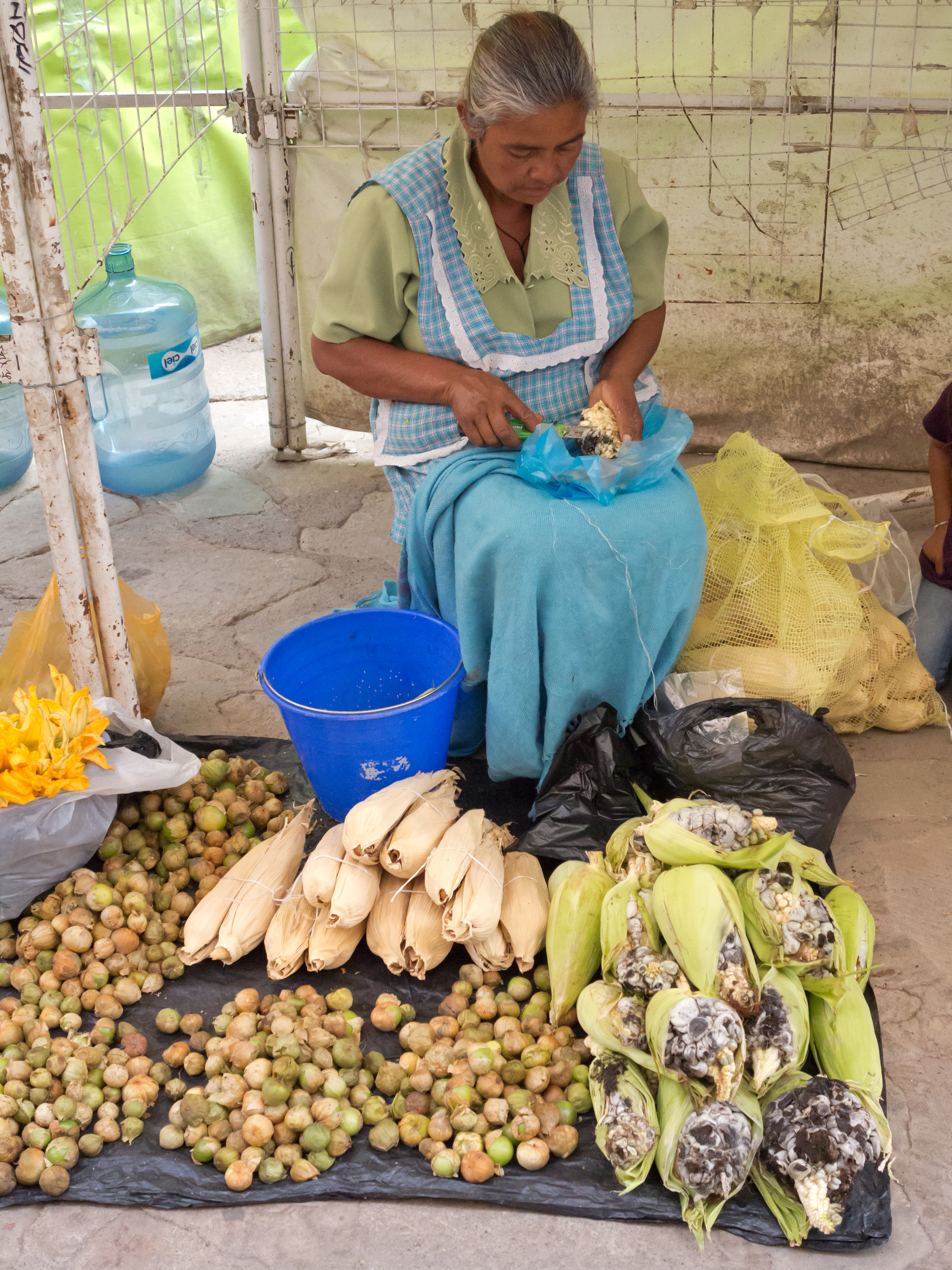
Merchant woman in Guanajuato market selling tomatillo to make salsa.

Contraception is still a big issue for Mexican women with a population of 107 million. It is the second most populous nation in Latin America. The population trend is even expected to grow in size in a little over thirty years. With a population that keeps increasing it was the first nation in 1973 to establish a family planning program. It is called MEXFAM (The Mexican Family Planning Association); the program has been recorded to have decreased Mexican households from 7.2 children to 2.4 in 1999.

Contraceptive use in rural areas is still far lower than that of urban areas. Approximately 25% of Mexican women live in rural areas, and of that, only 44% of those use birth control, and their fertility rate, 4.7%, is almost twice that of urban women.” Mexico was even able to incorporate a sexual education program in the schools to educate on contraception, but with many young girls living in rural areas, they are usually not able to attend.

Emergency Contraception in Mexico Since the introduction of Emergency Contraception (EC) into the Mexican family planning guidelines in 2004, knowledge and usage of EC has been rapidly growing. The past years, EC has been available as an over-the-counter product without age restriction and also free of charge in the national health system. So far, there are 13 different kinds of pills that can be purchased without prescription (LNG-EC products) and one where a prescription is needed (UPA-EC product). The rapid growth in education and use of Emergency Contraception, can be seen in a study conducted by Han et al. (2017), comparing data from the ENADID survey from 2006, 2009, and 2014. EC knowledge among women has accordingly inclined from 62% in 2006, 79% in 2009 to 83% in 2014, and the use EC among women who have generally used contraception rose from 3% (2006), to 11% (2009) to 14% (2014). However, certain disparities in the increased knowledge have been identified. Reproductive health experts have concluded, that "stigma, gender, relationships and ethnicity may all play a role in a woman´s experience in receiving birth control", leading to less, or even denied access to EC. Lower wealth and education, rural living and indigenous status on access and knowledge are associated with less possibilities of contact to EC resources, denying women in certain living situations the chances to break out of sometimes repressive gender roles and with less bodily autonomy. So while the rapid growth in knowledge and use of Emergency Contraception in Mexico can be seen as a successful step in women's empowerment, a lot of steps still must be taken in order to include Mexican women in all kinds of living situations.

=== Sexuality ===
There are still persisting inequalities between levels of sexual experience between females and males. In national survey of Mexican youth published in 2000, 22% of men and 11% of women of the age 16 had admitted to having experienced sexual intercourse. However, these rates for both men and women remain fairly low due to the cultural perception that it is inappropriate to engage in intercourse before marriage. This shared cultural belief stems from the traditional teachings of the Catholic Church which has had great influence over Latin American cultures.

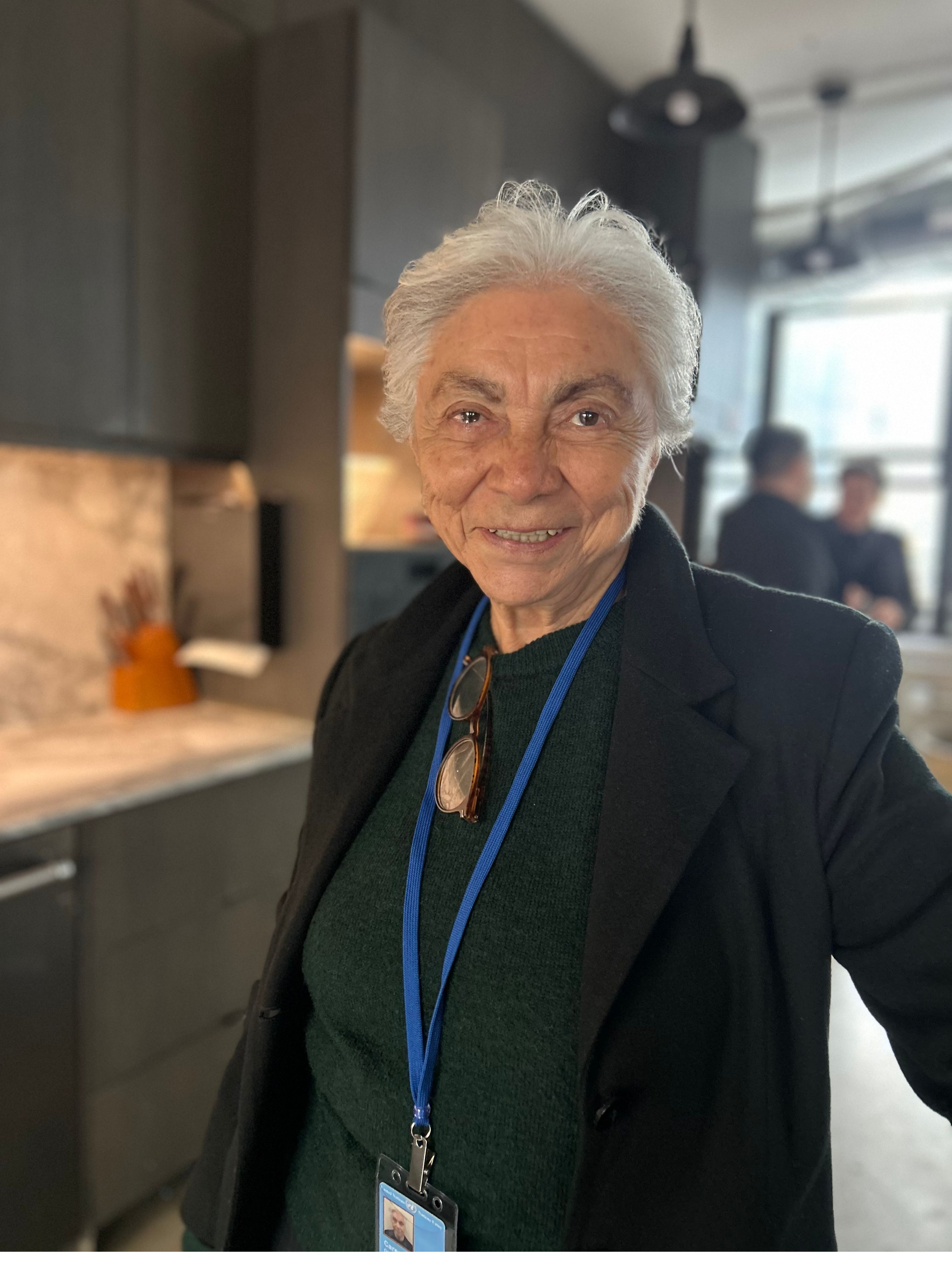
Gloria Careaga Pérez Social psychologist, feminist, and co-founder of Mexico’s first gender studies program

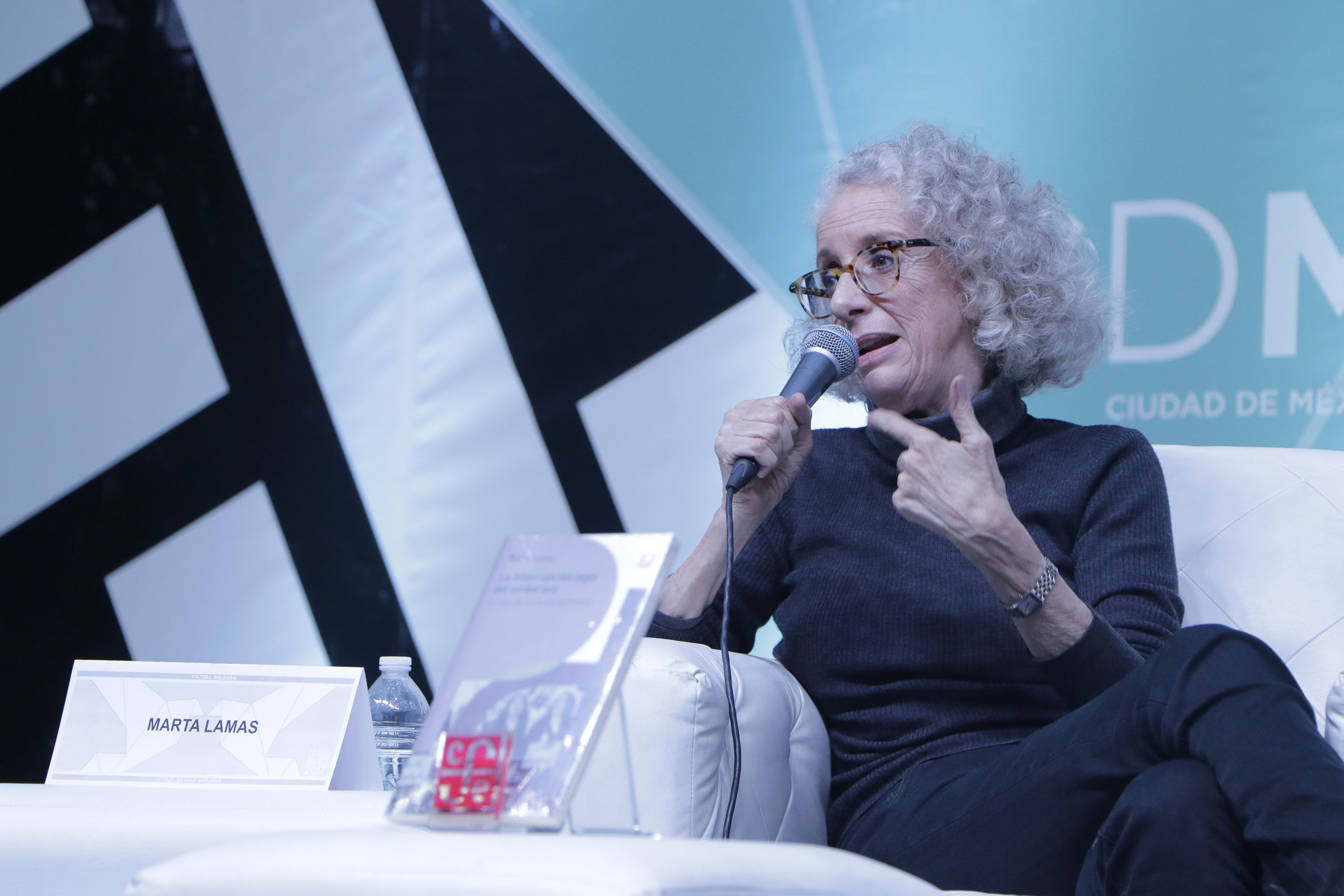
Marta Lamas Anthropologist and feminist activist, founder of Debate Feminista'

=== Perceptions of beauty ===
Mexican women have participated in international beauty competitions.

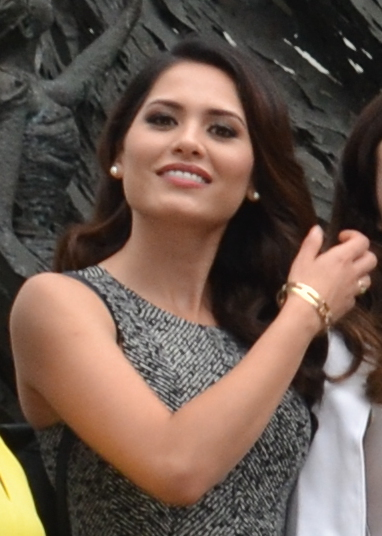
Miss Universe 2020
Andrea Meza

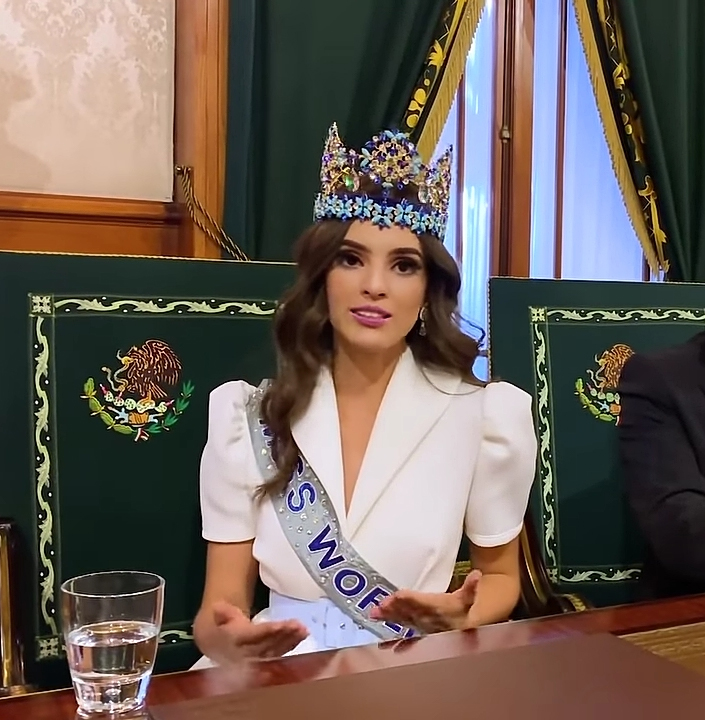
Miss World 2018
Vanessa Ponce

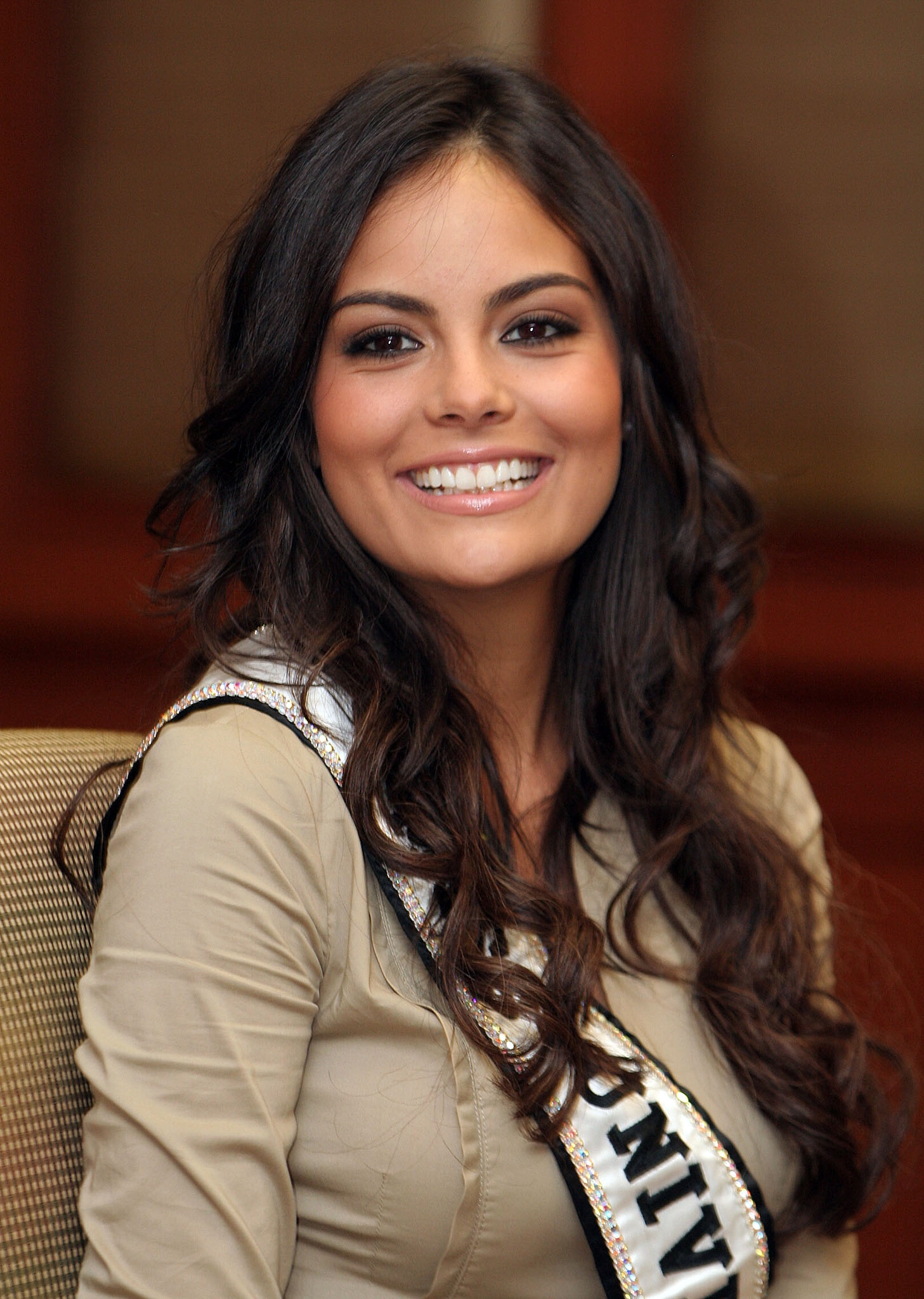
Miss Universe 2010
Ximena Navarrete

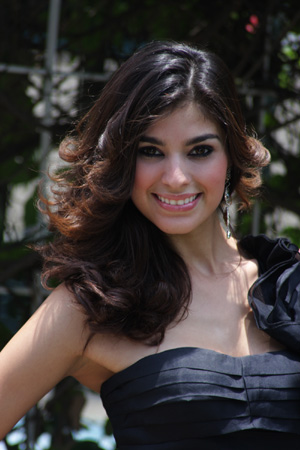
Miss International 2009
Anagabriela Espinoza

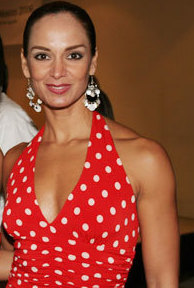
Miss Universe 1991
Lupita Jones

== Activism ==
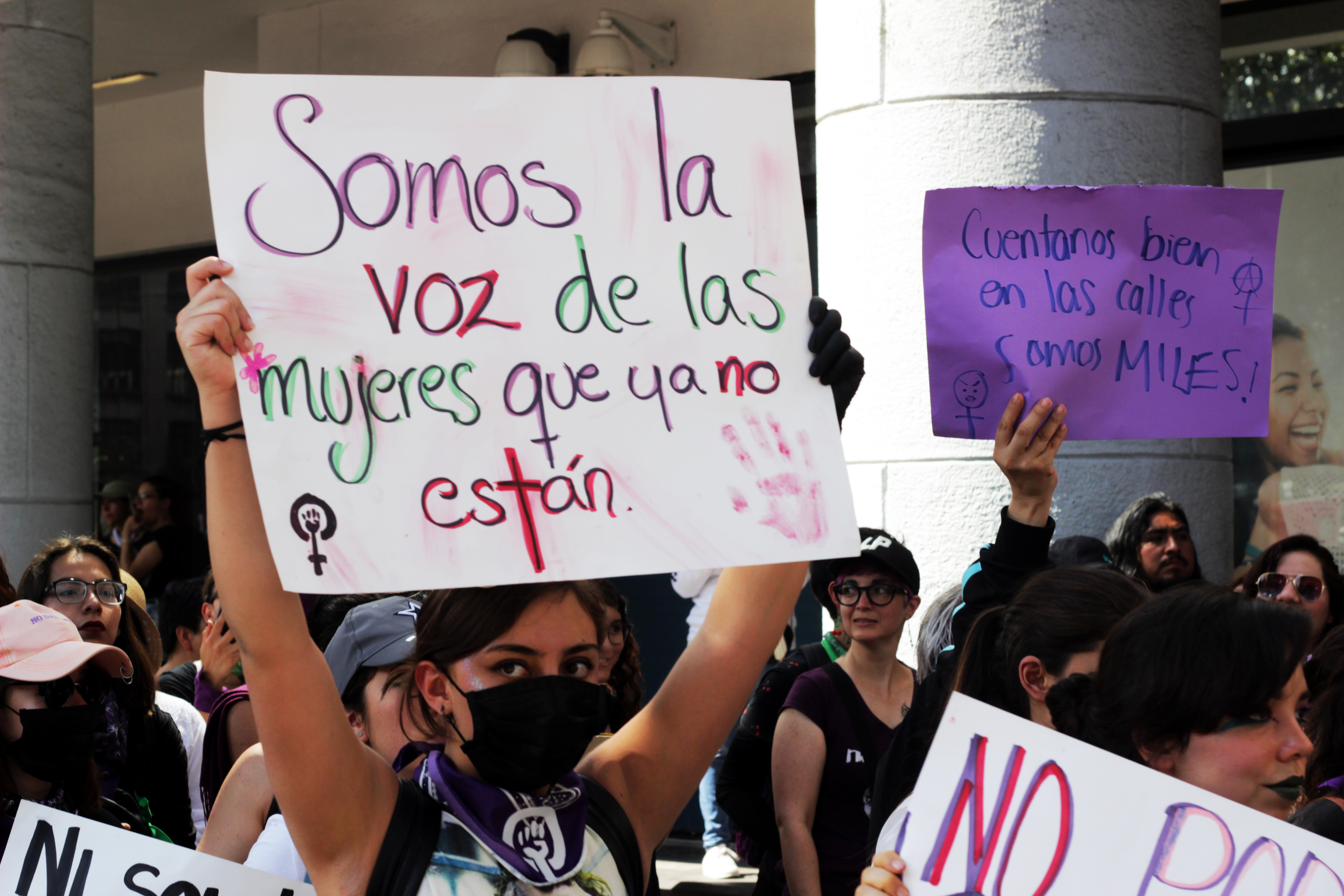
Glorieta de las mujeres que luchan "Roundabout of the women who fight" in Mexico City

In 2020, activists called for a one-day strike by women on March 9, the day after International Women's Day (March 8). The strike has been called "A Day Without Women," to emphasize women's importance in Mexico. At the March 8th demonstration in Mexico City, there was a crowd estimated at 80,000 people. There was a widespread response to the strike the next day as well, with both events reported in the international press. The strike is part of a new wave of feminism in Mexico. President Andrés Manuel López Obrador has been called tone-deaf on the issue, a source of feminist criticism.

=== Human rights activists ===
A number of women have been active in various kinds of human rights movements in Mexico.

=== Official logo of the government of Mexico ===
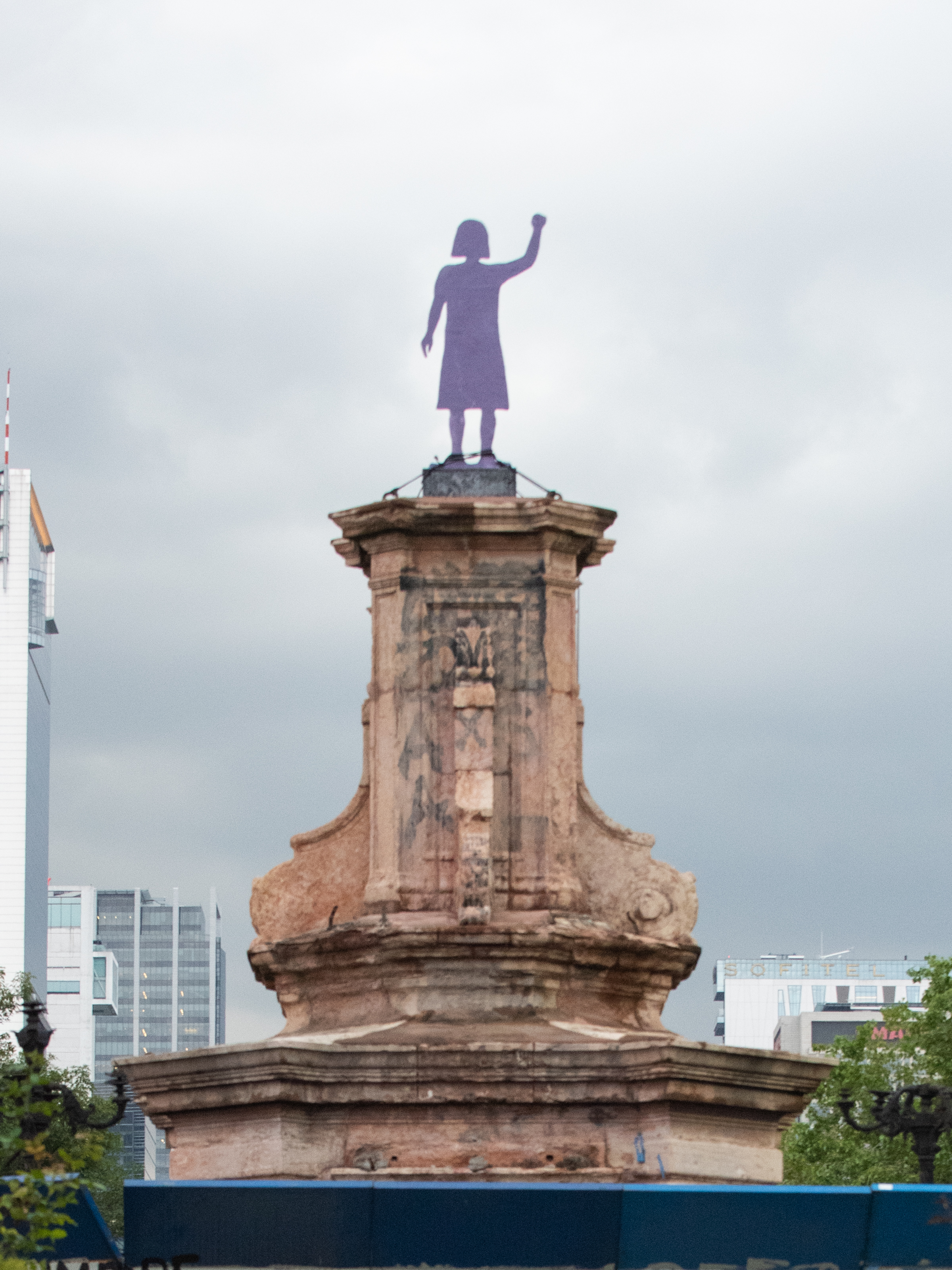
Bust of Rosario Castellanos is in the Series G Mexican Peso, FFyL-UNAM

The original logo of the Government of Mexico, in force since Andrés Manuel López Obrador assumed the Presidency on December 1, 2018, caused controversy by showing five men protagonists of the history of Mexico and no woman. In the image the characters appear, that López Obrador has qualified as his references on various occasions. These are Benito Juárez (1806–1872) president who faced the French and American invasion; Francisco Ignacio Madero (1873–1913), forerunner of the Mexican Revolution, and Lázaro Cárdenas (1895–1970), president who nationalized oil. Also Miguel Hidalgo (1753–1811) new Hispanic priest who starred the Grito de Dolores with which the War of Independence began, and José María Morelos (1765–1815), one of the main leaders of the independence struggle.

=== Female version ===
A new official logo featuring prominent women in the country's history on the occasion of the commemoration of International Women's Day. In the green and gold logo, used in official events and in government social networks five celebrities appear on the motto "Women transforming Mexico. March, women's month." In the center of the image appears holding a Mexican flag Leona Vicario (1789–1842), one of the most outstanding figures of the Mexican War of Independence (1810–1821) who served as an informant for the insurgents from Mexico City then capital of the vice-royalty. To her left, it is also drawn Josefa Ortiz de Domínguez (1768–1829), known as "la Corregidora" who played a fundamental role in the conspiracy that gave rise to the beginning of the independence movement from the state of Querétaro. The nun and neo-Hispanic writer sister sor Juana Inés de la Cruz (1648–1695), one of the main exponents of the Golden Age of literature in Spanish thanks to her lyrical and dramatic work, both religious and profane stars in the far left of the image. On the opposite side, the revolutionary Carmen Serdán (1875–1948), is drawn, who strongly supported from the city of Puebla to Francisco Ignacio Madero in his proclamation against the dictatorship of Porfirio Díaz, which was finally overthrown in 1911. On her side is located Elvia Carrillo Puerto (1878–1968), who was a feminist leader who fought for the right to vote of women in Mexico, which was achieved in 1953 and that she became one of the first women to hold office elected when elected as a deputy in the state congress of Yucatan.

== See also ==
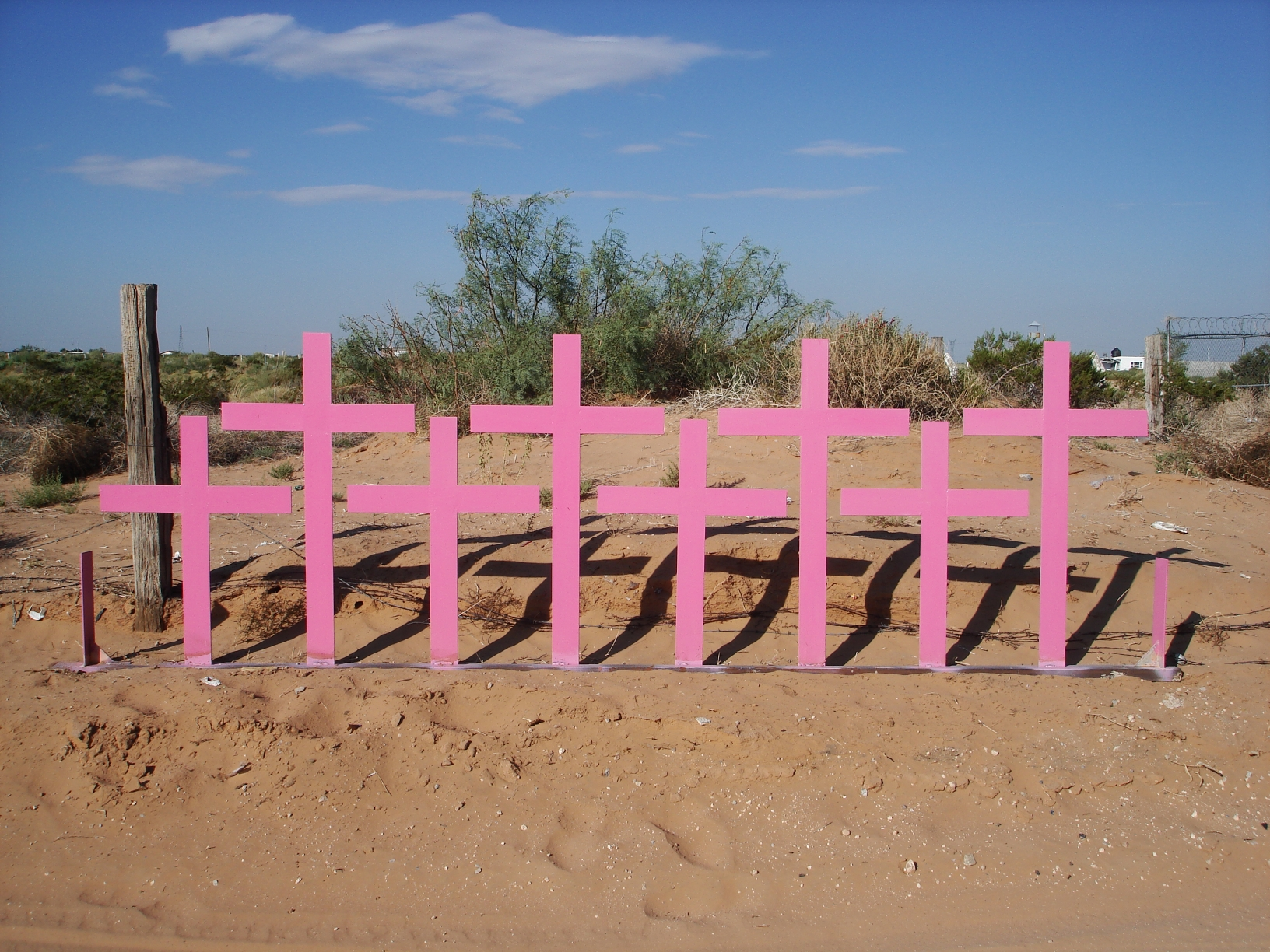
Female homicides in Ciudad Juárez

- Women in the EZLN
- Human rights in Mexico
- Prostitution in Mexico
- Eugenics in Mexico
- Women in the Americas
