= International Domestic Workers Federation =

Labour organisation

IDWF
- The International Domestic Workers Federation
- Founded: 2013
- Location: International
- Members: 590,000
- Key people: Elizabeth Tang, General Secretary
- Website: idwfed.org

The International Domestic Workers Federation (IDWF) is the first membership-based global organization of household and domestic workers. The IDWF has 81 affiliates in 63 countries, representing over 590,000 members.

== History ==
In 2006, the First Domestic Workers International Conference was hosted by the FNV Netherlands.

This network was provided strong support by the International Union of Food, Agricultural, Hotel, Restaurant, Catering, Tobacco and Allied Workers' Associations, Women in Informal Employment Globalizing and Organizing (WIEGO), International Trade Union Confederation (ITUC), the Global Labour Institute (GLI) and International Labour Organization.

At the International Labour Conference (ILC) in Geneva in 2009, the International Domestic Workers Network (IDWN) was launched.

In June 2011, after a 2-year negotiating process, the ILO Convention concerning Decent Work for Domestic Workers (C189) was passed. The IDWN's Steering Committee accepted 14 domestic workers' organizations' membership applications as the first group of IDWN affiliates, at a meeting held in May 2012. The Founding Congress was held on 26–28 October 2013, and the IDWN was renamed to its present name, the International Domestic Workers Federation (IDWF).

== Activity ==
IDWF engages in both advocacy and research efforts to organize domestic workers around the globe.

The International Domestic Workers Federation (IDWF) has been instrumental in documenting violence and exploitation of domestic workers, as well as bringing attention to their struggle. With an eye towards the context of the care economy, safe migration, and ending sexual abuse, the IDWF has centered its efforts on organizing migrant and refugee domestic workers.

== See also ==
- National Domestic Workers Alliance (U.S. affiliate)
- SINACTRAHO (Mexican affiliate)
