= SINACTRAHO =

National Union of Domestic Workers in Mexico

National Union of Domestic Workers
- Sindicato Nacional de Trabajadores y Trabajadoras del Hogar
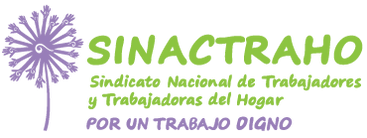
- Abbreviation: SINACTRAHO
- Formation: 2015
- Headquarters: Mexico City
- Website: https://sinactraho.org.mx/

SINACTRAHO (Spanish: Sindicato Nacional de Trabajadores y Trabajadoras del Hogar; the National Union of Domestic Workers) is a Mexican labor organization founded in 2015 with the goal of protecting the rights of domestic workers. The organization is affiliated with the Unión Nacional de Trabajadores de México and is part of the International Domestic Workers Federation.

== Founding and objectives ==
The SINACTRAHO constitutive assembly met in August 2015, with the participation of domestic workers of all genders from the states of Puebla, Colima, Chiapas, the State of Mexico, and Mexico City. It is the first legally established union in Mexico that focuses its activities on domestic work. Its aims include defending labor rights, opposing discrimination, eradicating workplace violence and gender-based violence, and increasing the economic and social value of domestic work in Mexico.

SINACTRAHO is affiliated with the Unión Nacional de Trabajadores de México, one of the largest labor federations in the country, and is a founding member organization of the International Domestic Workers Federation.

Among its founders is the Mexican social activist Marcelina Bautista, a domestic worker since she was 14 years old. The organization was created in close collaboration with the Centro de Apoyo y Capacitación para Empleadas del Hogar (CACEH), which since 2000 has functioned as a space for education and personal development for women employed as domestic workers.

== Activities ==
The organization's primary aims have included incorporating domestic workers into the Mexican social security system, improving access to day care for such workers, ensuring health coverage for chronic illnesses, and getting Mexico to ratify the International Labour Organization's Convention on Domestic Workers. The goal of ratification was accomplished in late 2019.

Since 2018, when the Supreme Court of Justice of the Nation failed to enforce the right of domestic workers to participate in the social security system, SINACTRAHO has assisted workers in this sector and their employers in navigating the social security process.

With the success of the 2018 movie Roma, which centers on a Mexican domestic worker, in 2019 SINACTRAHO established a collaboration with the Mexican filmmaker Alfonso Cuarón to demand improved conditions for household workers. The organization arranged screenings of the film and was represented at the Academy Awards ceremony.
