= Marcelina Bautista =

Mexican domestic worker and activist

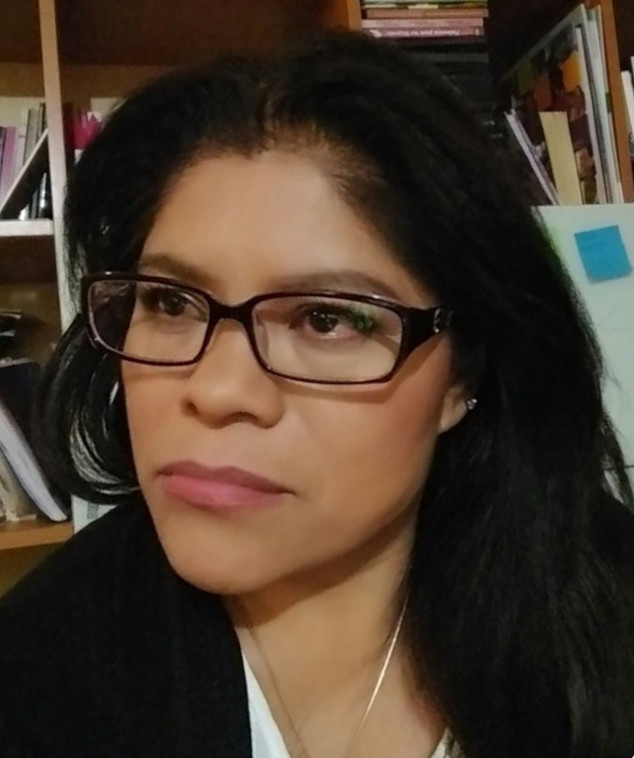
- Bautista in 2017
- Born: 25 April 1966 (age 59); Tierra Colorada Apasco, Nochixtlán, Oaxaca, Mexico
- Occupation(s): Domestic worker, trade union organizer
- Known for: Founding SINACTRAHO

Marcelina Bautista Bautista (born 25 April 1966) is a Mexican human rights activist and trade union organizer. She worked as a domestic worker for 22 years, starting at the age of 14. She put herself through school, graduating from the Ibero-American University and started organizing her fellow workers. She founded the organizations Centro de Apoyo y Capacitación para Empleadas del Hogar in 2000 and Sindicato Nacional de Trabajadores y Trabajadoras del Hogar (SINACTRAHO) in 2015.

== Early life and domestic work ==
Marcelina Bautista Bautista was born on 25 April 1966 to a Mixtec peasant family in Tierra Colorada Apasco, Nochixtlán, Oaxaca, a town with around 500 people. She grew up alongside 11 siblings speaking Mixtec, and had aspirations of becoming a lawyer. She moved from Oaxaca to Mexico City at age 14.

At the age of 14, after she completed primary school, she was forced to travel to Mexico City to work and support her family. She knew very little Spanish and wandered the streets until she found a sign reading "looking for a servant". She was employed as a domestic worker for 22 years, doing childcare and housework. As a domestic worker, she experienced discrimination and exploitation. She was underpaid by her employer and beaten for not knowing how to use a washing machine.

== Education and social activism ==
Bautista completed an education while working full-time. She spent three years learning about Mexican labor laws and the Constitution. She earned a diploma in Communication and Civil Society from the Ibero-American University. In 1988, she travelled to Bogotá, Colombia and was a participant in the First Latin American and Caribbean Meeting of Domestic Workers. She started organizing domestic workers around the same time, meeting at a north side park in Mexico City.

Bautista founded the organization Centro de Apoyo y Capacitación para Empleadas del Hogar (CACEH) in 2000. Through the organization, she promoted domestic workers' rights and started the process of their unionization. It was the first Mexican civil association dedicated to defending the rights of domestic workers. Through CACEH, Bautista pursued legal reforms requiring employers to enroll their workers in social security.

Bautista continued organizing domestic workers and has become one of the primary activists fighting for their rights in Mexico. From 2006 to 2012, she served as the General Secretary of the Confederación Latinoamericana y del Caribe de Trabajadoras del Hogar (CONLACTRAHO). She was a regional coordinator of Red Internacional de Trabajadoras del Hogar from 2009 to 2013. Bautista participated in the creation and approval of the Convention on Domestic Workers, which set labor standards for domestic workers and was adopted by the International Labour Organization in 2011. She was the regional coordinator for Latin America for the Federación Internacional de Trabajadoras del Hogar (FITH) from 2013 to 2016. She founded the Sindicato Nacional de Trabajadores y Trabajadoras del Hogar (SINACTRAHO) in 2015.

In 2019, Bautista was invited to attend the 91st Academy Awards by Alfonso Cuarón, director of the 2018 film Roma, which follows the life of a live-in housekeeper.

== Awards ==
- Premio Hermila Galindo de la Comisión de Derechos Humanos del Distrito Federal (2006)
- Premio de Derechos Humanos de la Friedrich Ebert Stiftung (2010)
- Premio Nacional por la Igualdad y la No Discriminación granted by the National Council to Prevent Discrimination (2013)
- Medalla Omecíhuatl (2017)
- BBC's 100 Women (2021)
