= Convention on Domestic Workers =

International Labour Organization convention

C189 Convention on Domestic Workers
Convention concerning Decent Work for Domestic Workers
- Parties to the convention (red) other ILO members (Grey)
- Signed: 16 June 2011
- Location: Geneva
- Effective: 5 September 2013
- Condition: 2 ratifications
- Ratifiers: 35
- Depositary: Director-General of the International Labour Office
- Languages: French and English

The Convention on Domestic Workers, formally the Convention concerning Decent Work for Domestic Workers is a convention setting labour standards for domestic workers. It is the 189th ILO convention and was adopted during the 100th session of the International Labour Organization, in 16 June 2011. It entered into force on 5 September 2013.

== Rights ==
The main rights given to domestic workers as decent work are daily and weekly (at least 24 h) rest hours, entitlement to minimum wage and to choose the place where they live and spend their leave. Ratifying states parties should also take protective measures against violence and should enforce a minimum age which is consistent with the minimum age at other types of employment. Workers furthermore have a right to a clear (preferably written) communication of employment conditions which should in case of international recruitment be communicated prior to immigration. They are furthermore not required to reside at the house where they work, or to stay at the house during their leave.

== Adoption and entry into force ==
The convention was put to vote on 16 June 2011 by a vote at the ILO conference in Geneva. As ILO is a tripartite organization, for every country the government, employers and workers' representatives are entitled to vote. The convention was adopted with 396 votes in favour and 16 against (and 63 abstentions). All Persian Gulf states voted in support, while abstentions were cast by (amongst others) the United Kingdom.

The convention entered into force one year after ratification by two countries, which is a standard entry into force condition for ILO conventions. Ratifications are to be communicated to the Secretary-General of the ILO.

On 26 April 2012, the Uruguayan parliament approved the convention and thereby became the first country to ratify it, followed by presidential assent on 30 April 2012 and deposit of its instrument of ratification in June 2012.

As of October 2021, it has been ratified by 35 states.

== Measures for domestic workers due to the Covid-19 phenomenon ==
The ILO estimated that 49.3% of domestic workers were significantly affected in the early stages of the pandemic. That figure peaked at 73.7 per cent on 15 May and then fell to 72.3 per cent on 4 June. At the beginning of June 2020, the number of COVID-19 infections exceeded 7.3 million cases in most countries and territories. As the number of cases spread so did the measures. In order to facilitate physical distancing, most countries have adopted full or partial blocking measures to prevent transmission.

Experience of the COVID-19 infection crisis showed that social protection and active labour market policy require strategically integrated planning and implementation. Preventing further job losses during the recession and preparing the workforce for the labour market supply is necessary during the future economic recovery. Strengthening synergy among social protection measures is a priority in supporting the ILO for its constituents.

== See also ==
- International Convention on the Protection of the Rights of All Migrant Workers and Members of Their Families
