= Feminism in Mexico =

Feminism in Mexico is the philosophy and activity aimed at creating, defining, and protecting political, economic, cultural, and social equality in women's rights and opportunities for Mexican women. Rooted in liberal thought, the term feminism came into use in late nineteenth-century Mexico and in common parlance among elites in the early twentieth century.

The history of feminism in Mexico can be divided chronologically into a number of periods with issues. For the conquest and colonial eras, some figures have been re-evaluated in the modern era and can be considered part of the history of feminism in Mexico. At the time of independence in the early nineteenth century, there were demands that women be defined as citizens. The late nineteenth century saw the explicit development of feminism as an ideology. Liberalism advocated secular education for both girls and boys as part of a modernizing project, and women entered the workforce as teachers. Those women were at the forefront of feminism, forming groups that critiqued existing treatment of women in the realms of legal status, access to education, and economic and political power. More scholarly attention is focused on the revolutionary period (1915–1925), although women's citizenship and legal equality were not explicitly issues for which the revolution was fought. The second wave (1968–1990, peaking in 1975–1985) and the post-1990 period have also received considerable scholarly attention.

Feminism has advocated for the equality of men and women, but middle-class women took the lead in the formation of feminist groups, the founding of journals to disseminate feminist thought, and other forms of activism. Working-class women in the modern era could advocate within their unions or political parties. The participants in the Mexico 68 clashes who went on to form that generation's feminist movement were predominantly students and educators. The advisers who established themselves within the unions after the 1985 earthquakes were educated women who understood the legal and political aspects of organized labor. What they realized was that to form a sustained movement and attract working-class women to what was a largely middle-class movement, they needed to utilize workers' expertise and knowledge of their jobs to meld a practical, working system.

In the 1990s, women's rights in indigenous communities became an issue, particularly in the Zapatista uprising in Chiapas. Reproductive rights remain an ongoing issue, particularly since 1991, when the Catholic Church in Mexico was no longer constitutionally restricted from being involved in politics.

== Feminist theory in Mexico ==
Feminist theory is the extension of feminism into theoretical or philosophical fields.

=== Traditional stereotypes ===
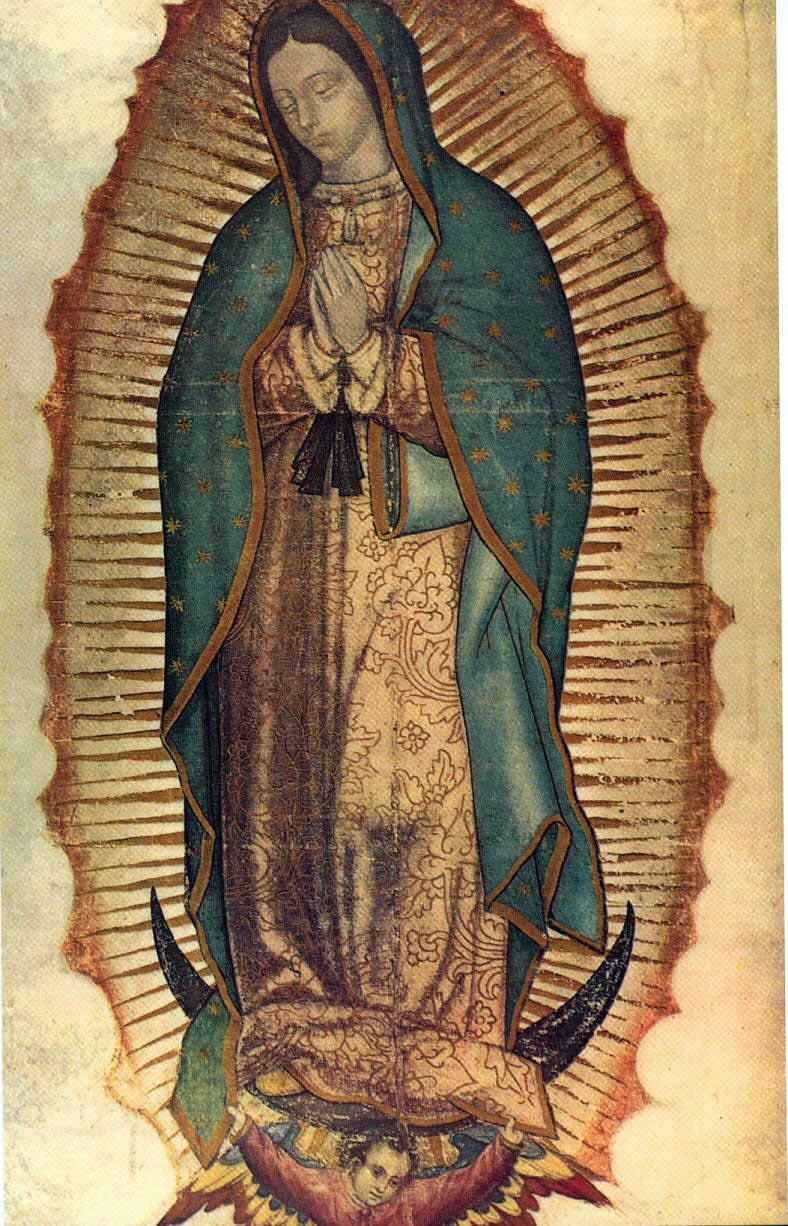
Our Lady of Guadalupe

In Mexico, most of these theories stem from postcolonialism and social constructionist ideologies. A postmodern approach to feminism highlights "the existence of multiple truths (rather than simply men and women's standpoints)," which plays out in the Mexican social perception, where the paternalistic machismo culture is neither clearly juxtaposed against a marianismo nor a malinchismo counterpart. In a particularly Mexican context, the traditional views of women have resided at polar opposite positions, wherein the pure, chaste, submissive, docile, giver-of-life marianistic woman, in the guise of Our Lady of Guadalupe, is at one end of the spectrum and the sinful, scheming, traitorous, deceptive, mestizo-producing, La Malinche is at the other. These stereotypes are further reinforced in popular culture via literature, art, theater, dance, film, television and commercials. Regardless of whether these portrayals are accurate, historically based, or were manipulated to serve vested interests, they have promoted three of the underlying themes of the female Mexican identity — Catholicism, Colonialism and Mestizo.

Until the latter part of the 19th century, the predominant images of women, whether in the arts or society as a whole, were those dictated by men and men's perceptions of women. After the Revolution the state created a new image of who was Mexican. Largely through the efforts of President Álvaro Obregón the cultural symbol became an indigenous Indian, usually a mestizo female, who represented a break with colonialism and Western imperialism. While men's definitions of women and their sphere remained the "official" and predominant cultural model, beginning in the 1920s women demanded that they define their own sphere.

In Mexico, some demands for women's equality stem from women's struggle between household commitments and underpaid jobs. Upper and middle-class families employ domestic help, allowing some women of means to be more accepting of traditional gender roles.

=== Changing perceptions ===
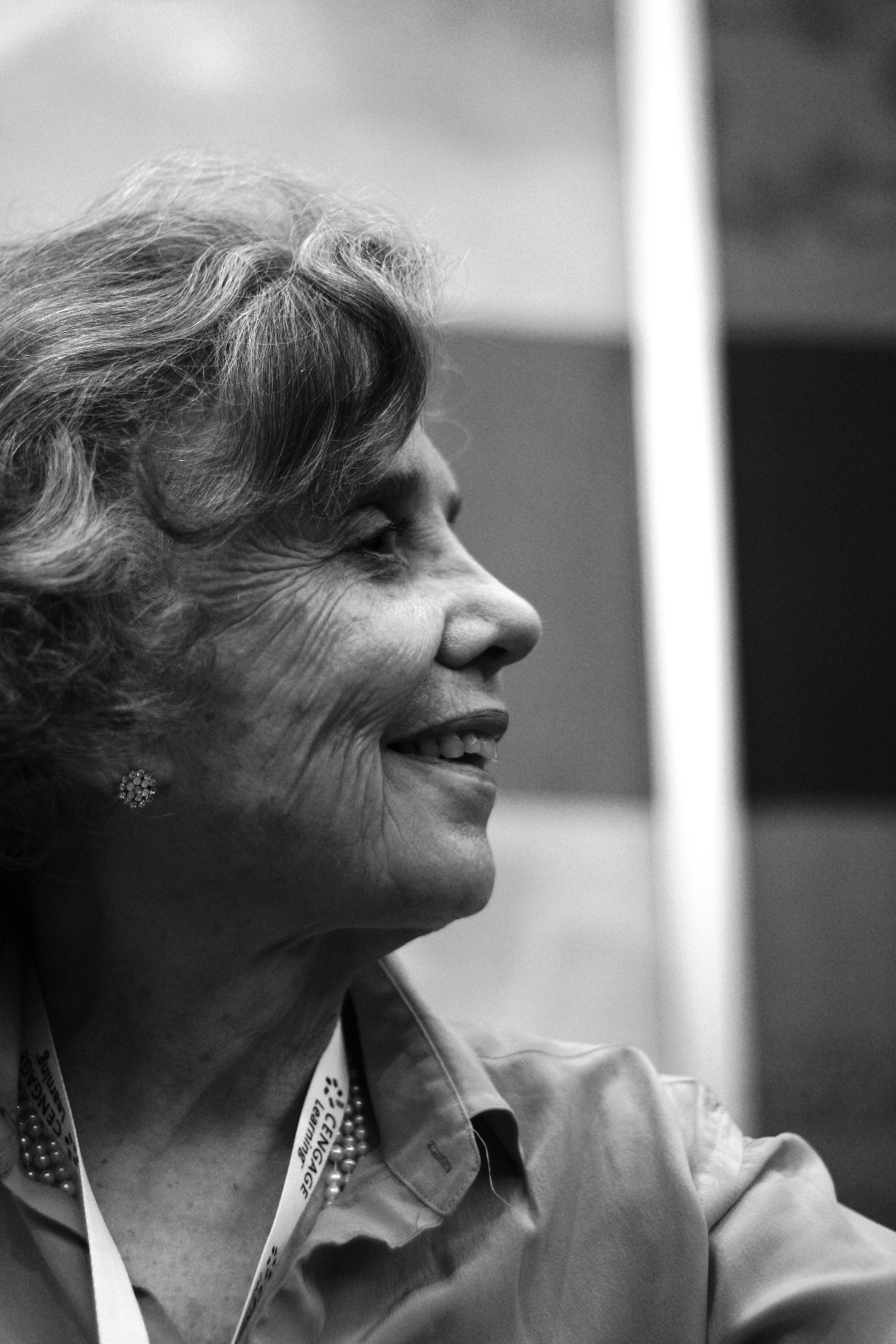
Elena Poniatowska

Women's depictions of themselves in art, novels, and photography were in opposition to their objectification and portrayal as subjects of art. By creating their own art, in the post-Revolutionary period, artists could claim their own identity and interpretation of femininity. While the female artists of the immediate period following the revolution tried in their own ways to redefine their personal perceptions of body and its imagery in new ways, they did not typically champion social change. It was the feminists who came after, looking back at their work, who began to characterize it as revolutionary in sparking social change. In the 1950s, a group of Mexican writers called "Generation of '50" were influential in questioning the values of Mexican society. Rosario Castellanos was one of the first to bring attention to the complicity of middle-class women in their own oppression and stated, "with the disappearance of the last servant will the first angry rebel appear". Castellanos sought to question caste and privilege, oppression, racism, and sexism through her writing. Her voice was joined by Elena Poniatowska, whose journalism, novels and short stories philosophically analyzed and evaluated the roles of women, those who had no empowerment, and the greater society.

Up until the 1980s, most discussion of feminism centered on the relationships between men and women, child-centric spheres, and wages. After that time period, bodies, personal needs, and sexuality emerged. Some feminist scholars since the 1980s have evaluated the historic record on women and shown that they were participants in shaping in the history of the country. In 1987, Julia Tuñón Pablos wrote Mujeres en la historia de México (Women in the History of Mexico), which was the first comprehensive account of women's historical contributions to Mexico from prehistory through the Twentieth Century. Since that time, extensive studies have shown that women were involved all areas of Mexican life. From the 1990s, gender perspective has increasingly become a focus for academic study.

== History ==
Women have played a pivotal role in Mexico's political struggles throughout its history, yet their service to the country did not result in political rights until the middle of the twentieth century, when women gained the right to vote.

=== Conquest era, 1519–21 ===
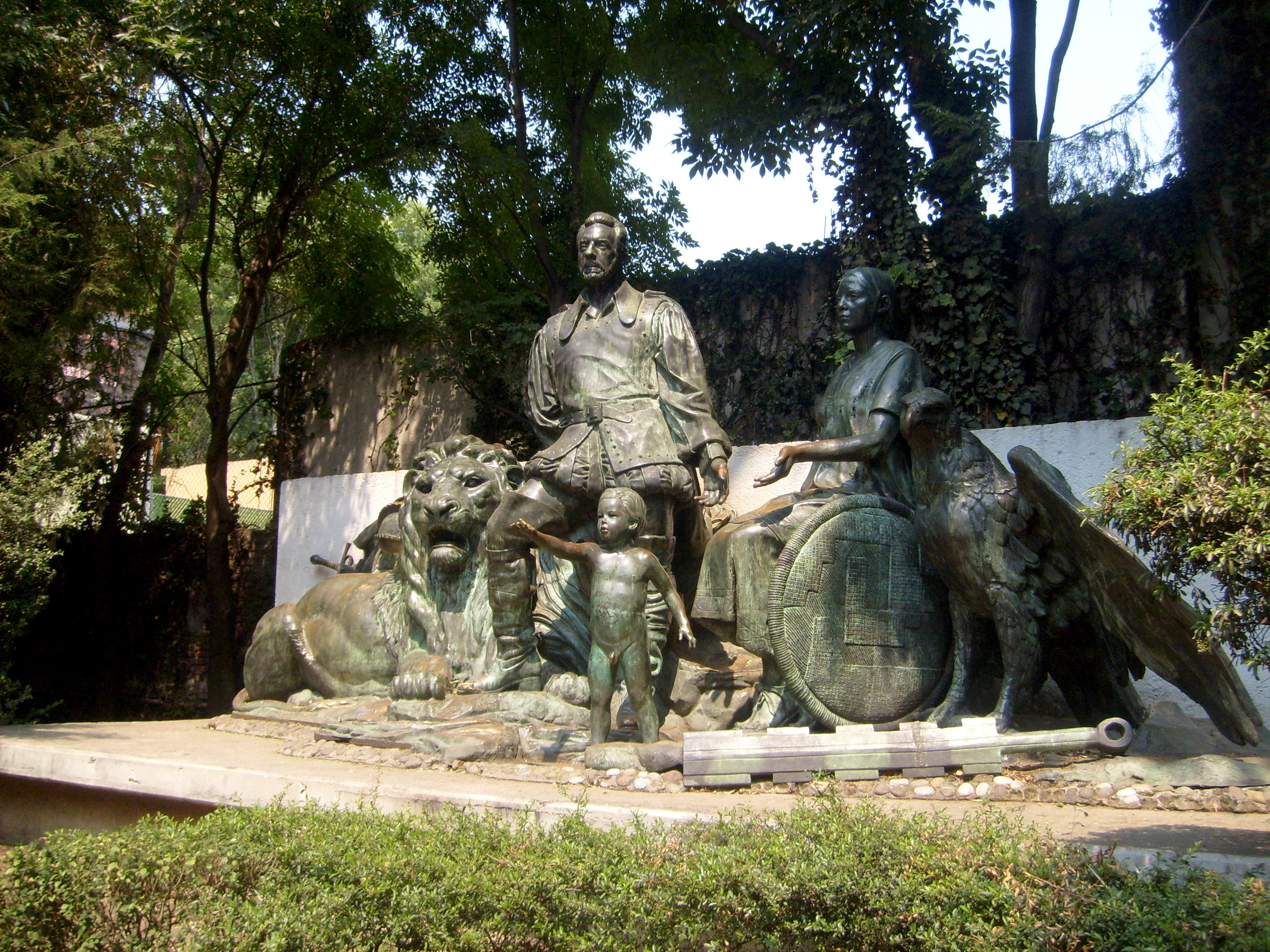
Modern statue of Cortés, Marina, and their son Martín

The most famous indigenous woman is Doña Marina, also known as La Malinche, whose role in the conquest of Mexico as cultural translator of Spanish conqueror Hernán Cortés depicted her as a traitor to her race and to Mexico. There are many colonial-era depictions of Malinche in indigenous manuscripts, showing her as the central figure, often larger than Cortés. In recent years, feminist scholars and writers have re-evaluated her role, showing sympathy for the choices she faced. However, the attempt to rescue her historical image from that as a traitor has not found popular support. President José López Portillo commissioned a sculpture of the first mixed-race family, Cortés, Doña Marina, and their mixed-race son Martín, which when he left office was removed from in front of Cortés house in Coyoacan, to an obscure location, the Jardín Xicoténcatl, Barrio de San Diego Churubusco, Mexico City.

=== Colonial era, 1521–1810 ===
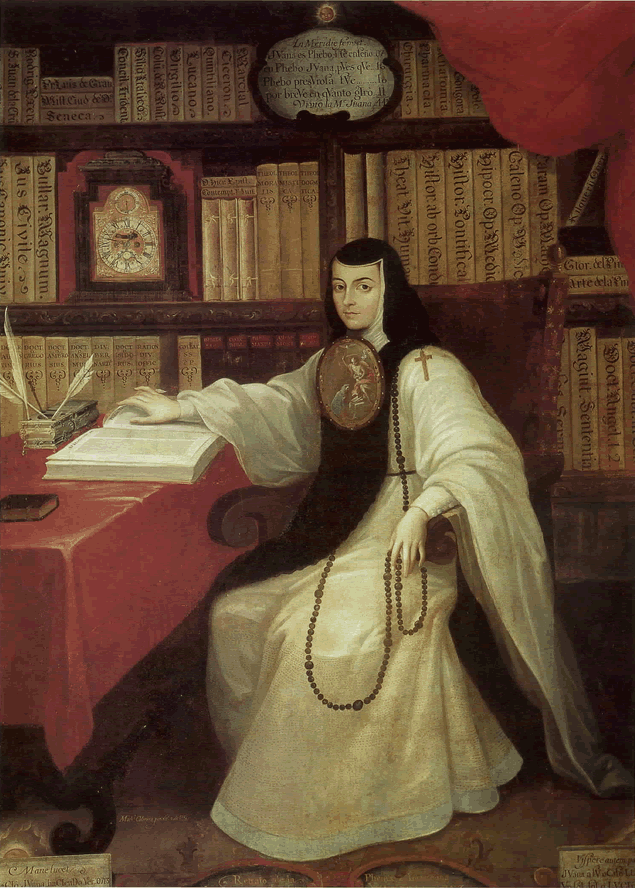
Sor Juana Inés de la Cruz (1648-1695), the "Tenth Muse" in her convent cell with her extensive library. Posthumous portrait by eighteenth-century painter Miguel Cabrera.

There were customary practices and legal structures that regulated society and women's roles in colonial Mexico. The Spanish crown divided the colonial population into two legal categories, the Republic of Indians (República de indios) and Republic of Spaniards (Republica de españoles), that comprised all non-indigenous individuals, including Afro-Mexicans and those of mixed-race. Racial status had a strong determinant on women's legal and social standing. Women were under the authority of men: fathers over daughters, husbands over wives. Widows were able to have fuller control over their lives and property. Women from families of financial means were provided a dowry, which remained the property of the wife. A husband gave his wife at marriage funds (arras) that were under her control, protected from his bankruptcy or other financial difficulty. A widow received a specified share of her husband's estate. Wealthy women were expected to uphold their family's honor by chaste and modest behavior. Despite restrictions, women were active in the economy, buying, selling property, and bequeathing property. Women also participated in the workforce, often forced by circumstances such as poverty or widowhood to do so.

In colonial Mexico, the vast majority of population was illiterate and entirely unschooled, and there was no priority for the education of girls. A few girls in cities attended schools run by cloistered nuns. Some entered convent schools at around age eight, "to remain cloistered for the rest of their lives." Private tutors educated girls from wealthy families, but generally only enough so that they could oversee a household. There were few opportunities for mixed-race boys or girls. "Education was, in short, highly selective as befits a stratified society, and the possibilities of self-realization were a lottery of birth rather than talent."

The one major exception to this picture of marginalization of women is Juana Inés de la Cruz, a Jeronymite nun known in her lifetime as the "Tenth Muse," for her literary output of plays and poems. She wrote a remarkable autobiography, in which she recounts her failed attempt to gain a formal education at the University of Mexico, and her decision to become a nun. In the twentieth century, her life and works have become widely known, and there is a vast literature on her life and works. She is celebrated by feminists. The Answer/La Respuesta by Sor Juana Inés de la Cruz was published by The Feminist Press.

=== Independence era, 1810–1821 ===
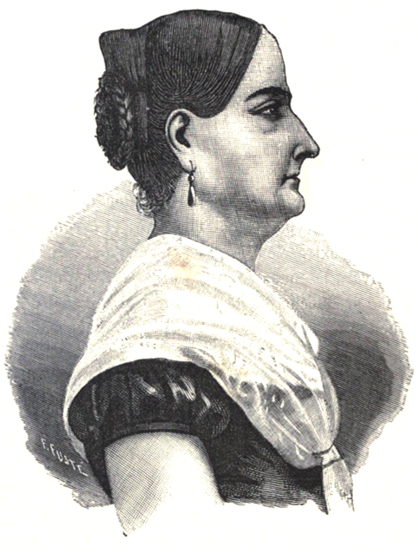
Josefa Ortiz de Domínguez, known as the Corregidora

Some women distinguished themselves during the Mexican War of Independence (1810-1821), and also were employed as spies, provocateurs, and seductresses. Newspapers in 1812 harangued women to take part in the independence effort as they owed their countrymen a debt for submitting to conquest and subordinating Mexico to Spanish rule. The most prominent female hero of the independence movement is Josefa Ortiz de Domínguez, known in Mexican history as La Corregidora. Her remains were moved to the Monument to Independence in Mexico City, there are statues of her in her honor, and her face has appeared on Mexican currency. Other distinguished women of the era are Gertrudis Bocanegra, María Luisa Martínez de García Rojas, Manuela Medina, Rita Pérez de Moreno, Maria Fermina Rivera, María Ignacia Rodríguez de Velasco y Osorio Barba, known as the Güera Rodríguez; and Leona Vicario.

=== Early national period and the Porfiriato, 1821–1911 ===
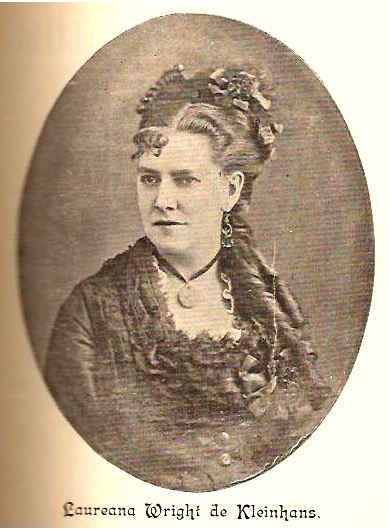
Laureana Wright de Kleinhans, considered the most brilliant and radical defender of women's emancipation

As early as 1824, some women in Zacatecas petitioned the state government, "Women also wish the title of citizen...to see themselves counted in the census as 'La ciudadana' (woman citizen)."

There were feminist gains between 1821 and 1910, but they were typically individual gains and not a formalized movement. In the late nineteenth century, feminism as a term came into the language. Rooted in liberalism, feminism in Mexico saw secular education as a means to give dignity to the roles of women as wives and mothers in Mexican families and to expand the women's freedom as individuals. Equal rights for women was not the primary focus in this period; however, some feminists began forming organizations for women's rights and founding journals to disseminate their ideas. Political and literary journals "were a central forum for the public debate of women's issues in Latin America."

A way to disseminate feminist thought was the founding of publications by and for women. In 1870, Rita Cetina Gutiérrez founded La Siempreviva (The Everlasting) in Yucatán, one of the first feminist societies in Mexico. The society founded a secondary school, which Cetina directed from 1886 to 1902, educating generations of young teaching women. and inspired others to open schools for women. In 1887, Laureana Wright de Kleinhans established a literary feminist group that published a magazine, "Violetas de Anáhuac" (Violets of Anáhuac), which demanded equality of the sexes and women's suffrage.

In the late 19th and early 20th centuries, Mexican women journalists played a crucial role in shaping national identity and advancing feminist discourse. Scholars like Cristina D. Ramírez highlight how these journalists employed a mestiza rhetoric, a blend of Indigenous, European, and feminist perspectives, to advocate for women’s rights and social reform. Figures such as Laureana Wright de Kleinhans and Juana Belén Gutiérrez de Mendoza used their publications to challenge gender norms, critique government policies, and promote the inclusion of women in public life. Their work not only contributed to feminist movements but also helped define Mexico’s evolving sense of nationhood, particularly in relation to mestizaje (racial and cultural mixing). Despite facing resistance from male-dominated institutions, these women laid the foundation for future feminist activism in Mexico.

In this period, the question of women's roles and the need for emancipation was taken up by men as well, most notably Genero García, who wrote two works on the problem of women's inequality, Educación errónea de la mujer y medios prácticas para corregirla (The erroneous education of woman and the practical means to correct it) (1891) and La emancipación de la mujer por medio del estudio (The emancipation of woman by means of education) (1891), as well as a volume of notable Mexican women. García saw the problem of women's inequality as a legal one within marriage, since the 1884 legal code prevented married women from acting in civil society on their own without the permission of their husbands. His critical stance on the equality of the sexes did not translate into political action.

As opposition to the Porfirio Díaz regime increased after 1900, activist women were brought together in anti-reelectionist liberal clubs, including supporters of the radical Mexican Liberal Party (PLM) and supporters of the presidency candidacy of Francisco I. Madero. Women's rights including suffrage were not an integral part of the anti- Díaz movements. In 1904, the Sociedad Protectora de la Mujer (The Society for the Protection of Women) formed and began publishing a feminist magazine, "La Mujer Mexicana" (The Mexican Woman).

In 1910, the Club Femenil Antirreeleccionista Hijas de Cuauhtémoc (Anti-Reelectionist Women's Club of the Daughters of Cuauhtémoc) led a protest against election fraud and demanded women's right to political participation.

=== Revolutionary period: 1911–1925 ===
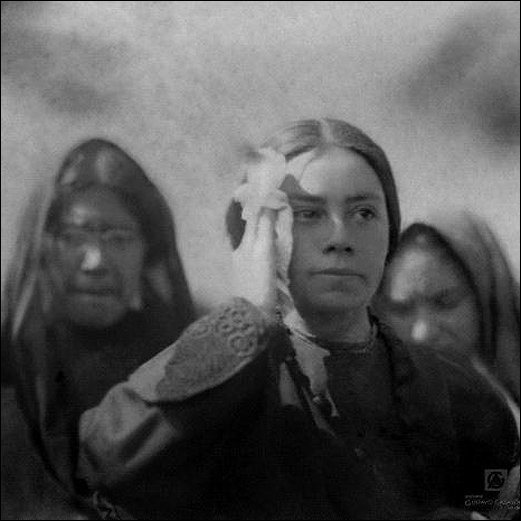
María Arias Bernal, supporter of Francisco I. Madero, defender of Mexico City in the coup against him

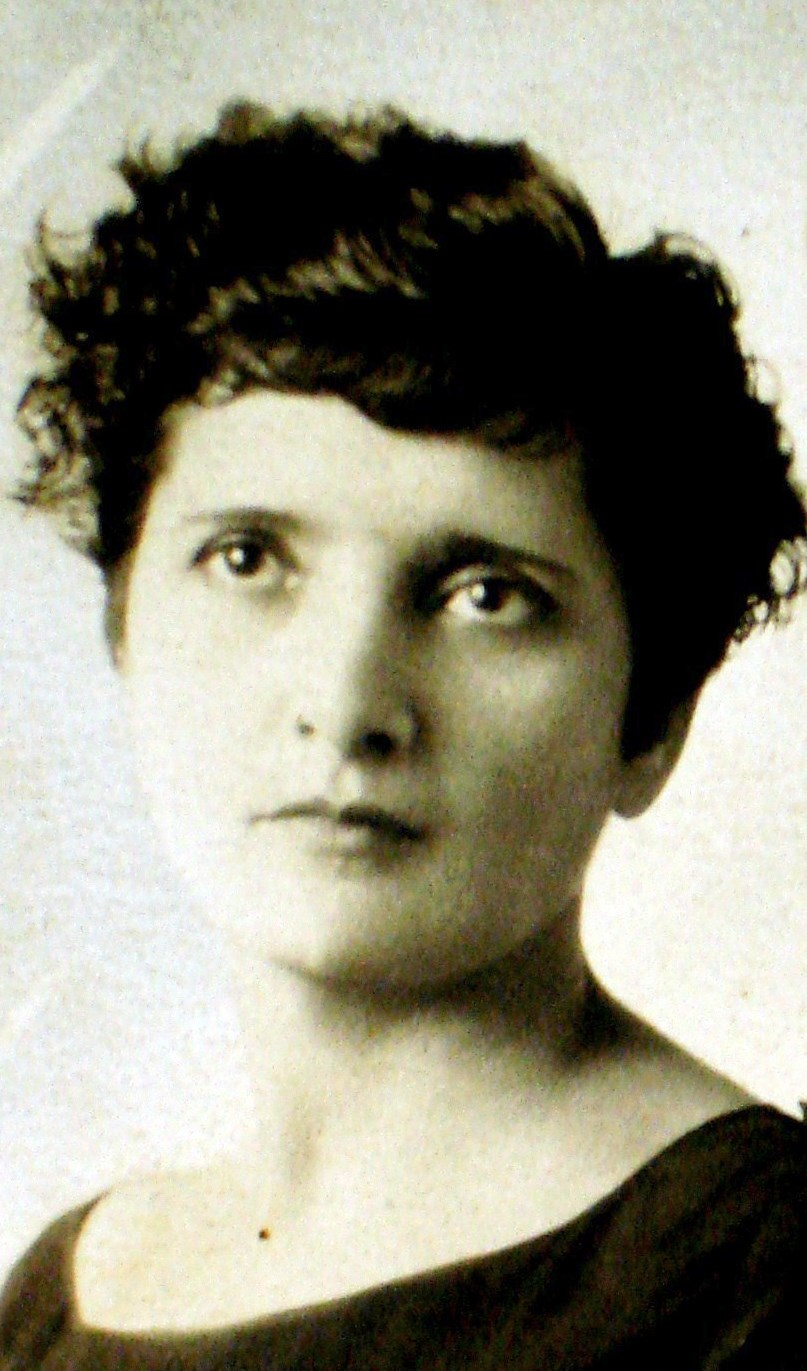
Elvia Carrillo Puerto

Level of education has played a largE part in Mexican feminism because schoolteachers were some of the first women to enter the work-force in Mexico. Many of the early feminists who emerged from the Revolution were teachers either before or after the war, as were the participants of the Primer Congreso Feminista, the first feminist congress in Mexico.

As they had in the War for Independence, many Mexican women served during the Mexican Revolution as soldiers and even troop leaders, as well as in more traditional camp-follower roles as cooks, laundresses, and nurses. However, those who gained recognition as veterans of the war were typically educated women who acted as couriers of arms and letters, propagandists, and spies. In part, this was due to an order issued on March 18, 1916, which decommissioned all military appointments of women retroactively and declared them null and void. Because of the nature of espionage, many of the women spies worked directly with the leadership of the revolution and thus had at least a semi-protected status as long as the leader they worked with was living. They formed anti-Huerta clubs, like the Club Femenil Lealtad (Women's Loyalty Club) founded in 1913 by María Arias Bernal, using their gender to disguise their activities.

The late nineteenth century had seen the emergence of educated women who pursued careers as novelists, journalists, and political activists. In Latin America generally and in Mexico in particular, a shared feminist consciousness was developing. Some legal gains for women were made during the Revolution, with the right to divorce attained in 1914. In 1915, Hermila Galindo founded a feminist publication, Mujer Moderna (The Modern Woman) which discussed both politics and feminist ideas, including suffrage. Galindo became an important adviser to Venustiano Carranza, leader of the winning Constitutionalist faction of the Revolution. Also in 1915, in October, the newly appointed governor of the Yucatán, Salvador Alvarado, who had studied both European and United States feminist theory and socialism, called for a feminist congress to be convened. In January 1916, the Primer Congreso Feminista (First Feminist Congress) was held in Mérida, Mexico, and discussed topics of education, including sexual education; the problem of religious fanaticism; legal rights and reforms; equal employment opportunity; and intellectual equality among others, but without any real challenge to defining women in terms of motherhood.

The 1917 Constitution of Mexico created by the reformist movement contained many of the ideas discussed in the Feminist Congress — free, mandatory, state-sponsored secular education; "equal pay for equal work" (though the delegates were not attempting to protect women, but rather protecting male workers from foreigners being paid higher wages); the preliminary steps to land reform; and a social, as well as political structure. While the Constitution did not prohibit women's enfranchisement, the 1918 National Election Law limited voting rights to males. Women continued to be outside the definition of "citizen." Women did not attain the vote until 1953 in Mexico. The Law of Family Relations of 1917 expanded the previous divorce provisions, giving women the right to alimony and child custody, as well as the ability to own property and take part in lawsuits.

In 1919, the Consejo Feminista Mexicano (Mexican Feminist Council) was created with the goals of attaining the right to vote and social and economic liberty and co-founded by Elena Torres Cuéllar; María "Cuca" del Refugio García, who was a proponent of indigenous women's rights, including protection of their lands and wages; and Juana Belén Gutiérrez de Mendoza, who became the first president of the Council and was an advocate of miner's rights and education. In 1922, Felipe Carrillo Puerto, governor of the Yucatán, proposed legislation giving women the right to vote and urged women to run for political offices. Heeding his call, Rosa Torre González became the first woman to be elected in any political capacity in Mexico, when she won a seat that same year on the Mérida Municipal Council. The following year, 1923, Carrillo Puerto's younger sister, Elvia Carrillo Puerto was one of three women delegates elected to the state legislature. The other two were Beatríz Peniche Barrera and Raquel Dzib Cicero.

In 1923 the First Feminist Congress of the Pan American League of Women was held in Mexico and demanded a wide range of political rights. That same year the Primer Congreso Nacional de Mujeres (First National Women's Congress) in Mexico City was held from which two factions emerged. The radicals, who were part of workers unions and resistance leagues from Yucatán and were aligned with Elena Torres Cuéllar and María "Cuca" del Refugio García. The moderates, who were teachers and women from Christian societies in Mexico City and representatives from the Pan American League and US feminist associations, followed the lead of G. Sofía Villa de Buentello. 1923 also saw the formation of the Frente Unico Pro Derechos de la Mujer (FUPDM) (United Front for Women‟s Rights). By 1925, women in two other Mexican states, Chiapas and San Luis Potosí had also gained the right to vote. Villa de Buentello organized the League of Iberian and Latin American Women to promote civil code reform in 1925. The group adopted a series of resolutions, primarily dealing with gender relations and behavior, which also contained provisions on the right to vote and hold public office. In 1925, the Liga de Mujeres Ibéricas e Hispanoamericanas (League of Spain and Spanish-American Women) with G. Sofía Villa de Buentello taking the lead organizing the Congreso de Mujeres de la Raza (Congress of Hispanic Women). Factional disputes emerged almost immediately, with Villa taking a moderate position and María del Refugio García and Elvia Carrillo Puerto taking a leftist position. Leftists saw the economic situation being at the root of women's oppression, including problems of working-class women, while Villa de Buentello was concerned with moral and judicial issues. Villa de Buentello supported the political equality of men and women, but condemned divorce. Such factional splits characterized later meetings of feminists.

=== Post-revolution: 1926–1967 ===
Throughout the 1920s and 1930s a series of conferences, congresses and meetings were held, dealing with sexual education and prostitution. Much of this attention was in response to the 1926 passage of the Reglamento para el Ejercicio de la Prostitución (Regulation for the Practice of Prostitution), an ordinance requiring prostitutes to register with authorities and submit to inspection and surveillance, which may have been part of a normal phenomenon which occurs at the end of conflict. Often, at the end of armed conflict, citizens turn to reordering the social and moral codes, regulating sexuality and redefining social roles.

Near the end of the decade, political parties, like the Partido Nacional Revolucionario (the precursor to PRI) and Partido Nacional Antireeleccionista (National Anti-Reelectionist Party (PNA)) included a women's platform in their agendas, but the most significant gains in this period were regarding practical matters of economic and social concerns. In 1931, 1933 and 1934 the Congreso Nacional de Mujeres Obreras y Campesinas (National Congress of Women Workers and Peasants) sponsored the Congreso Contra la Prostitución (Congress Against Prostitution). One important development that these groups secured in this time frame was the legalization of abortion in case of rape in 1931.

Throughout the 1930s FUPDM concentrated on social programs that would benefit lower-class women, advocating for rent reductions of market stalls, and lowered taxes and utility rates. These programs earned the group a large following and their pressure, with the support of President Lázaro Cárdenas, resulted in the ratification in 1939 by all 28 Mexican states of an amendment to Article 34 of the Constitution granting enfranchisement to women. The Mexican Congress refused to formally recognize the ratification or proclaim that the change was in effect. The years from 1940 to 1968 were predominantly a period of inactivity for feminists as World War II shifted the focus to other concerns. There were scattered gains, most specifically, women finally acquired the right to vote. In 1952, the FUPDM had organized the Alianza de Mujeres Mexicanas (Mexican Women's Alliance) and made a deal with candidate Adolfo Ruiz Cortines that they would support his presidential bid in exchange for suffrage. Ruiz consented to the arrangement if Alianza could secure 500,000 women's signatures on a petition asking for enfranchisement. When Ruiz was elected, Alianza delivered the signatures and as promised, women were granted the right to vote in federal elections in 1953.

=== The second wave: 1968–1974 ===
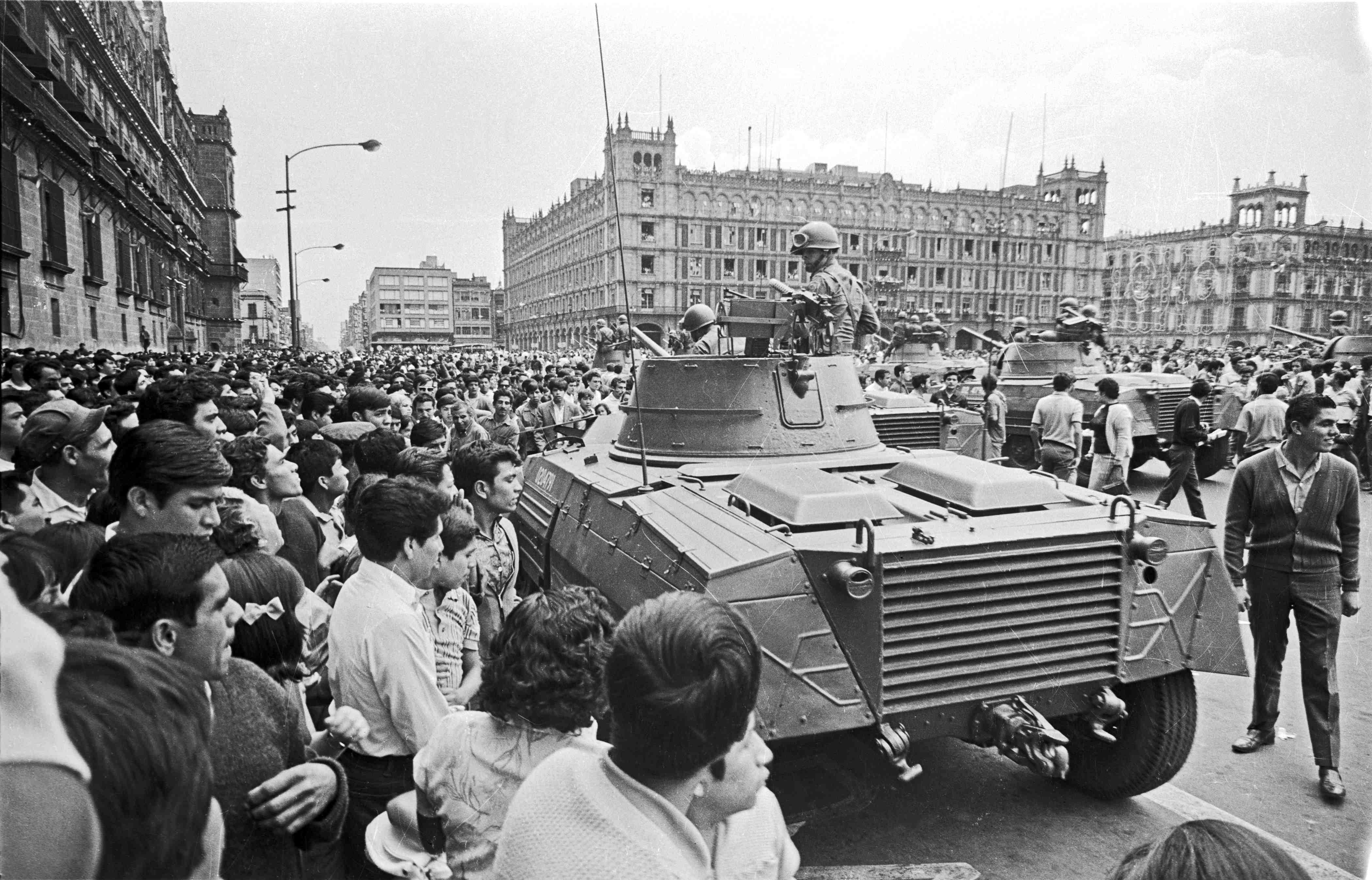
Armored cars at protests at the "Zócalo" in Mexico City in 1968

Between July and October 1968, a group of women participants in the student protests that would become known as Mexico 68, began a fledgling feminist movement. During the uprising, women used their perceived apolitical status and gender to bypass police barricades. Gaining access to places that men could not go raised women's awareness of their power. Though the protests were suppressed by government forces before political change happened, the dynamic of man-woman relationships changed, as activists realized platonic working relationships could exist without leading to romance.

The uprising mobilized students and mothers. Seeing their children slain brought some lower class and poor women en masse for the first time into the realm of activism with educated middle-class women. In the early 1970s, feminists were overwhelmingly middle-class, university-educated, Marxist-influenced women, who participated in left-wing politics. They did not have much larger influence at the time and were often the butt of jokes and derision in the mainstream press. Some "Mother's Movements" developed in rural and urban areas and across socio-economic barriers, as mothers protested repeatedly for social ills and inequalities to be addressed by their governments. What began as a voice for their children, soon became demands for other kinds of change, like adequate food, sufficient water, and working utilities. Voices also were raised questioning disappearances in various places in the country, but in this period, those questions met with little success.

The visibility of feminists increased in the 1970s. Rosario Castellanos presented her critique of the current situation of women at a government-sponsored gathering. "La abnegación, una virtud loca" (Submission, an insane virtue) denounced women's lack of rights. Gabriela Cano calls Castellanos "the lucid voice of the new feminism." In 1972, Alaíde Foppa created the radio program Foro de la Mujer (Women's Forum) which was broadcast on Radio Universidad, to discuss inequalities within Mexican society, violence and how violence should be treated as a public rather than a private concern, and to explore women's lives. In 1975, Foppa co-founded with Margarita García Flores the publication Fem, a magazine for scholarly analysis of issues from a feminist perspective.

In addition to the more practical Mother's Movements, Mexican feminism, called "New Feminism" in this era, became more intellectual and began questioning gender roles and inequalities. Between June and July 1975, the UN World Conference on Women was held in Mexico City. Mexico hosted delegates from 133 member states, who discussed equality, and governments were forced to evaluate how women fared in their societies. Despite the fact that many Mexican feminists viewed the proceedings as a publicity stunt by the government and that some of the international feminists disparaged the Mexican feminist movement, the conference laid the groundwork for a future path, bringing new issues and concerns into the open and marking the point when frank discussions of sexuality emerged. Spurred by the 1975 conferences, six of the Mexican women's organizations merged into the Coalicion de Mujeres Feministas (Coalition of Feminist Women), hoping to make headway on abortion, rape and violence in 1976. The Coalicion dominated women's efforts until 1979, when some of its more leftist members formed the Frente Nacional de Lucha por la Liberacion y los Derechos de las Mujeres, (National Front in the Struggle for Women's Liberation and Rights). Both groups had withered by the early 1980s.

In the 1970s during the presidency of Luis Echeverría (1970-1976), the Mexican government launched a program to encourage family planning in Mexico. With gains in the sphere of public health and the drop in child mortality, overpopulation was seen as national problem. The government initiated a campaign to lower the national birthrate by reaching women directly, though telenovelas, ("soap operas"). Story lines portrayed families with fewer families as being more prosperous. The Catholic Church was adamantly against family planning and the government's way of promoting it was innovative.

=== Second wave: 1975–1989 ===
An economic crisis, which began in 1976, brought women together across class lines for the first time. Social issues gave women a new political voice as they demanded solutions to address problems created by the rural-to-urban migration which was taking place. Women formed neighborhood coalitions to deal with lack of housing, sanitation, transportation, utilities, and water. As more people moved into cities to find work, lack of investment in those areas, as well as education and health facilities, became challenges that united women's efforts. Though these colonias populares (neighborhood movements) were making "demands for genuine representation and state accountability as well as social citizenship rights" they did not ask for systemic changes to improve women's societal positions. As the debt crisis intensified and Mexico devalued its currency to gain international loans, wages decreased while the cost of living escalated, causing more and more women to enter the workforce. Companies began hiring women because they could pay them lower wages, male unemployment soared, and feminist activity came to a standstill.

Mobilization, popular demonstration, and social movements came together in a new way in response to the devastating 1985 earthquakes. The scope of the destruction invigorated the dormant women's movement to meet the immediate needs of families. There was a recognition during this time that a short-term disaster relief movement could be turned into an organization focused on implementing long-term political gain. Feminist groups, local grass-roots organizations, and NGOs (non-governmental organizations) stepped in to offer aid that the government or official political organizations were either unable or incapable of providing. Feminists were prominent in many NGOs, and were connected to networks beyond Mexico. In the wake of the fraudulent 1988 elections, women's groups became involved in movements for democratization and organization against the Institutional Revolutionary Party, which had been in power since 1929. One such organization was Mujeres en Lucha por the Democracia (Women's Struggle for Democracy). Simultaneously, several worker's unions implemented female advisory boards, with the goals of educating, training and politically organizing garment workers. Feminists serving on advisory boards made workers aware that they could change the environment and attitude of their places of employment and demand changes in areas other than wages and hours. They expanded demands to include addressing sexual harassment, covering child and health care, improving job training and education, raising workers' awareness, and changing the actual work conditions.

Feminism and gender as fields of academic study emerged in the 1980s, with courses as Mexican universities offered for the first time. Under the editorship of Marta Lamas, a biannual publication, Debate feminista was launched in 1990. In Guadalajara, Cristina Palomar launched the gender studies publication La Ventana in 1995.

=== Post-1990 ===
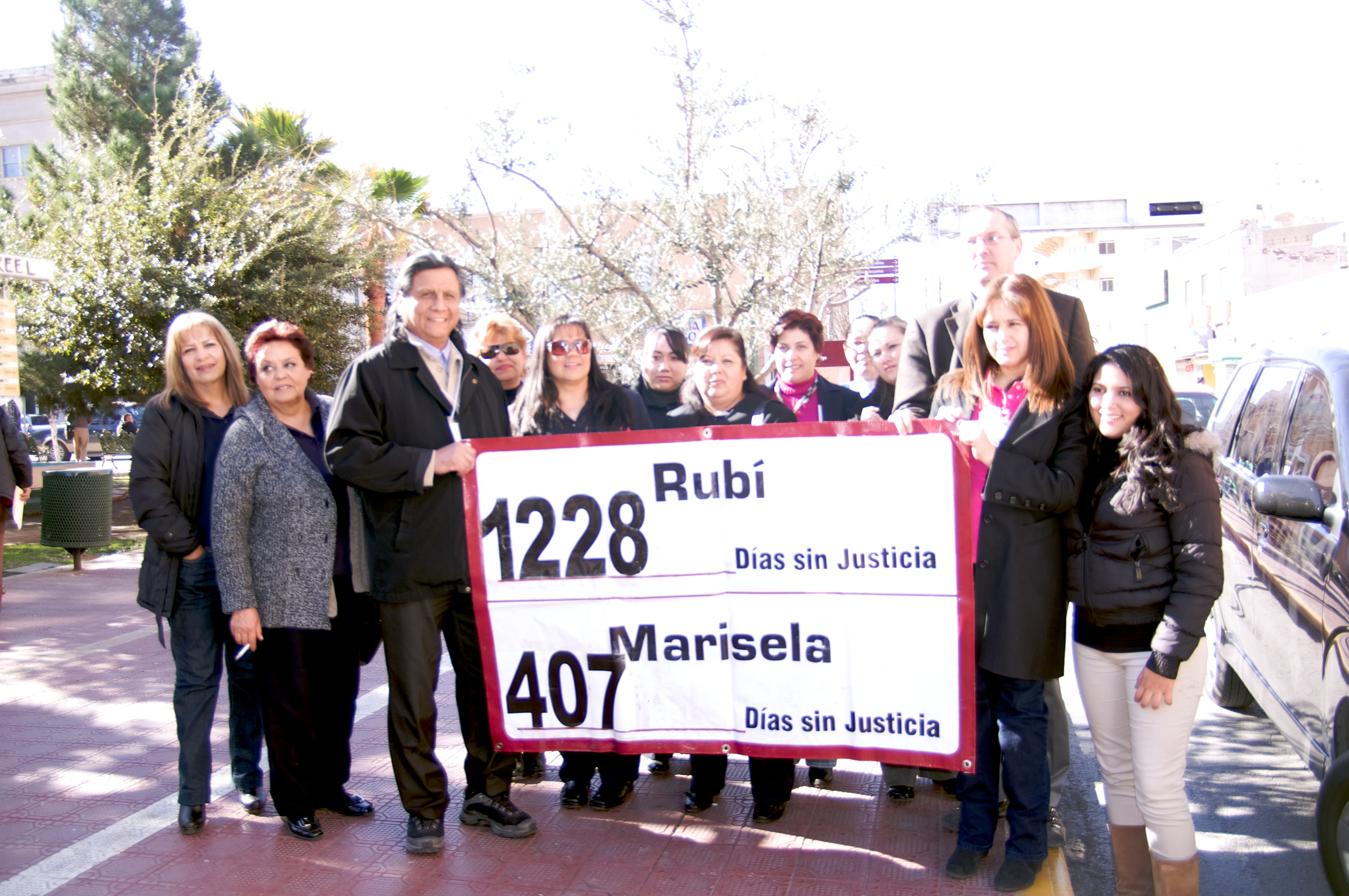
Members of the Women's Human Rights Centre in Ciudad Chihuahua, Mexico call for justice for the murders of Rubi and Marisela.

The period beginning in 1990 marked a shift in the politics of Mexico which would open up Mexican democracy and see the presidency won in 2000 by the opposition National Action Party (PAN). State governorships were earlier taken by the PAN. As a new electoral law went into effect in 1997 the PRI lost control of the lower house followed by the PRI's historic loss of the presidency in 2000. The impact that end of the virtual one-party-rule would have on women in Mexico was an open question. The year 1990 saw the launch of Debate Feminista (Feminist Debate), a publication founded by Marta Lamas, which aimed at connecting academic feminist theory with the practices of activists in the women's movement. Debate has become one of the most important journals in Latin America, printing articles written by both women and men.

In 1991, there were a number of constitutional changes as Mexico sought to join the North American Free Trade Agreement with the U.S. and Canada. The 1917 Constitution had strong anticlerical measures that restricted the role of the Catholic Church in Mexico. A major reform established freedom of religious belief, granted open practice of all religions, and was an opening for the Catholic Church to participate in politics. For the first time in the 20th century, established diplomatic relations between Mexico and the Vatican. Almost immediately, the Catholic church launched a campaign opposing family planning and a condom distribution program the Mexican government was sponsoring as part of an HIV/AIDS prevention program. In reaction, the feminist movement began studying pro-choice movements in France and the United States, to analyze how to direct the discourse in Mexico. In 1992 they formed the Grupo de Information en Reproduction Elegida (GIRE) (Information Group on Reproductive Choice). Transforming the discussion from whether one was for or against abortion to focus on who should decide was a pivotal change in forward-progress of the abortion debate in Mexico. In order the gauge the public perception, GIRE in conjunction with Gallup polling, completed national surveys in 1992, 1993 and 1994, which confirmed that over 75% of the population felt that the decision of family planning should belong to a woman and her partner.

After 1997, when PRI lost control of the legislature, female activists and victims' relatives in Chihuahua convinced the state government to create special law enforcement divisions to address disappearances and deaths of women in Ciudad Juarez. Success in the state legislature led to a similar law at the national level, which also aimed at investigating and prosecution of Dirty War and narco-trafficking disappearances. By 2004 the violence toward women had escalated to the point that María Marcela Lagarde y de los Ríos introduced the term femicide, originally coined in the United States, to Latin American audiences to refer to abductions, death and disappearances of women and girls which is allowed by the state and happens with impunity.

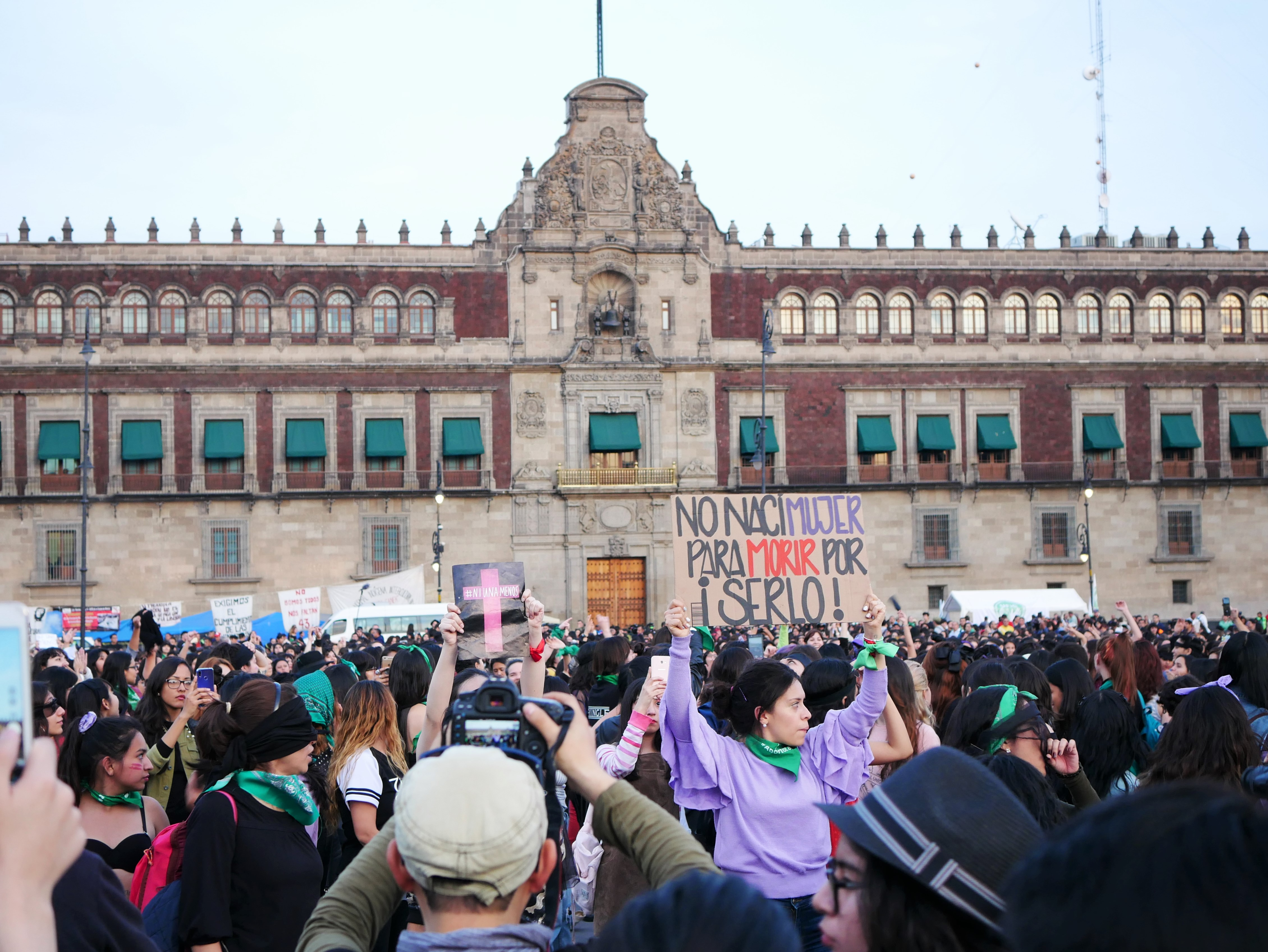
Femicide protest at Zocalo in 2019 in front of Palacio National

=== 2019–present ===
In early August 2019, around 300 women in Mexico City gathered to protest two incidents of accused rape of a teenage girl by policemen, which had occurred within a few days of each other. Mexico City Mayor Claudia Sheinbaum, ally to President Andrés Manuel López Obrador, "infuriated feminist protesters by branding their first mobilisation – which resulted in the glass entrance to the attorney general’s office being smashed – a provocation”, leading to thousands more gathering to protest. Furthermore, President López Obrador himself was elected on a populist left-wing platform, but made alliance with evangelical Christian conservatives, and has also enacted significant budget cuts to programs like women's shelters, which has further contributed to feminist disappointment and dissent with López Obrador and his ally Sheinbaum. Protesters and feminist activists called for an increase in police accountability, better media reporting and respect for the privacy of rape victims, and policy at the local and federal level for increased security and action against domestic violence and femicide. Protesters and activists called attention to widespread harassment and murder, with nearly 70% of Mexican women being victims of sexual assault and around 9 women killed every day, as well as a very low rate of rape reporting due to a lack in trust of the police. Since August 2019 there have been a number of marches and protests centered around stopping violence against women in Mexico in Mexico City with hundreds of participants, notably after The Day of the Dead celebrations (early November 2019) and International Day for the Elimination of Violence against Women 2019.

In 2020 a National Women’s Strike was held in Mexico on March 9, partly organized by Arussi Unda, to protest and raise awareness of the increasing violence faced by women across the country. The COVID-19 pandemic in Mexico and accompanying lockdowns put a damper on the growing movement, and the March 8, 2021, International Women's Day demonstrations were smaller and generally more peaceful than those of previous years. Much of the women′s ire was directed at AMLO personally and MORENA′s support of accused rapist Felix Salgado as a candidate for governor of Guerrero. AMLO insists he has been a strong supporter of women′s rights and of feminism. Although the world was shutting down due to COVID-19, the number of women being murdered continued to increase. There was a 2.7% increase in killings from the year 2022 to 2023. Flashing forwarding to 2024, the femicide in Mexico has steadily increased each year. However, this does not stop the crowds of women who show up each International Women's Day to support a change in women's rights in their country.

== Issues ==
As of 2023 in the Global Gender Gap Index measurement of countries by the World Economic Forum, Mexico, is ranked 33rd on gender equality; the United States is ranked 43rd.

=== Reproductive rights ===
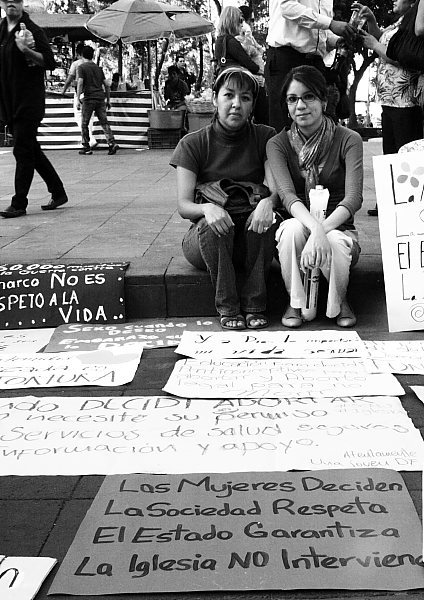
Women campaigning for the decriminalisation of abortion in 2011

In the middle of the Second Wave, there was hope by activists that gains would be made in the area of contraception and a woman's right to her own body choices. President Luis Echeverría had convened the Interdisciplinary Group for the Study of Abortion, which included anthropologists, attorneys, clergy (Catholic, Jewish and Protestant), demographers, economists, philosophers, physicians, and psychologists. Their findings, in a report issued in 1976, were that criminality of voluntary abortion should cease and that abortion services should be included in the government health package. The recommendations were neither published or implemented. In 1980, feminists convinced the Communist Party to table a bill for voluntary motherhood, but it never moved forward. In 1983, a proposal was made to modify the penal code, but the strong reactions from conservative factions dissuaded the government from action.

In 1989, a scandal broke when police raided a private abortion clinic, detaining doctors, nurses and patients. They were jailed without a court order in Tlaxcoaque, subjected to extortion demands, and some of the women reported they were tortured. After her release, one of the victims filed a lawsuit alleging police brutality and the media picked up the story. In a first for Mexico's feminist movement, feminists published a notice in response to the situation, and obtained 283 signatories with different political alliances and gained 427 endorsements. For the first time, feminists and political parties spoke in harmony. The period marked slow, but steady gains for women in the country.

Within a month Vicente Fox's 2000 election, the PAN governor of Guanajuato attempted to ban abortion even in the case of rape. In a speech to commemorate International Women's Day Fox's Secretary of Labor, Carlos Abascal, angered many women by proclaiming feminism "as the source of many moral and social ills, such as 'so-called free love, homosexuality, prostitution, promiscuity, abortion, and the destruction of the family'." In reaction, feminists staged protests and demanded political protection. In Guanajuato, Verónica Cruz Sánchez coordinated protests over numerous weeks which eventually defeated the measure. Rosario Robles, feminist leader of the left-wing Party of the Democratic Revolution (PRD) led efforts in Mexico City to expand abortion rights in cases when the health of the mother or child is jeopardized. After 38 years of work by the feminist movement, in 2007 the Supreme Court of Justice of the Nation decriminalized abortions in Mexico City which occur by 12 weeks of gestation. GIRE lawyers assisted in drafting legislation and in coordinating defense of the law when lawsuits alleged it was unconstitutional. Marta Lamas testified during the Supreme Court trial.

The fight for abortion rights in other states continues, since many state laws criminalize miscarriage in a crime characterized as "aggravated homicide of a family member" and activists have worked to have excessively harsh sentences of up to 30 years reduced. In 2010, Veronica Cruz was successful in leading the effort to free seven women serving prison sentences for abortion or miscarriage in Guanajuato and in 2011 secured a similar release in Guerrero. In November 2014, the SCJN began hearings on a case from Veracruz, which is the first case in Mexico to ask the court to consider whether women have a constitutional right to abortion and whether criminalization should be eliminated across the nation.

In 2019, during a surge of feminist protests happening in the country, the “green tide” — an originally-Argentinian movement that seeks reproductive rights — was popularized by different feminist groups in Mexico. This movement uses mobilization (such as campaigns and protests) to demand bodily autonomy and protection for women in Latin America, and has continued to rise in popularity in Mexico during the early 2020s.

On September 7, 2021, the SCJN declared the federal decriminalization of abortion in Mexico. Before this, 28 states had restrictive abortion laws that only allowed people to terminate their pregnancy if they met certain criteria (such as rape, fetal malformations, and health risks for the pregnant person) and punished them otherwise. Now, given the SCJN’s decision, even if these states have penalties for abortion stipulated in their laws, they cannot legally enforce them.

=== Indigenous women's rights ===
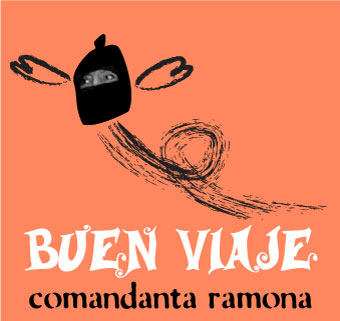
Poster commemorating EZLN Comandanta Ramona

In 1987 feminists from the organization Comaletzin A.C. began working with indigenous women in Chiapas, Morelos, Puebla, and Sonora for the first time. In 1989 the Center for Research and Action for Women and the Women's Group of San Cristóbal de las Casas initiated programs for indigenous women in Chiapas and the Guatemalan refugee community against sexual and domestic violence. In Oaxaca and Veracruz, Women for Dialogue and in Michoacán, Women in Solidarity Action (EMAS), who work with Purépecha women, also began helping indigenous women in their struggles for rights.

Indigenous women began demanding rights beginning in 1990. Because many indigenous women had been forced into the workplace, their concerns had similarities with urban workers, as were their concerns with violence, lack of political representation, education, family planning choices, and other issues typically addressed by feminists. However, indigenous women also faced an ethnic discrimination and cultural orientation that was different from feminists, and particularly those from urban areas. In some of their cultures, early marriage, as young as 13 or 14 prevailed; in other cultures, derecho de pernada (right of the first night) allowed rape and abuse of women with impunity for their attackers, while in others, organized violence against women had been used to both punish activism and send a message to their men that women's demands would not be tolerated. Similar to other women of color and minorities in other feminist movements indigenous women in Mexico have struggled with ethnocentrism from mainstream feminist groups.

With the 1994 formation of the Ejército Zapatista de Liberación Nacional (EZLN) (Zapatista Army of National Liberation), indigenous women in Chiapas advocated for gender equality with the leaders of the uprising. On January 1, 1994, the Zapatistas announced the Ley Revolucionaria de Mujeres (Women's Revolutionary Law), which in a series of ten provisions recognized women's rights regarding children, education, health, marriage, military participation, political participation, protection from violence and work and wages. While not recognized by official state or federal governments, the laws were an important gain for these indigenous women within their native cultures. In 1997 a national meeting of indigenous women titled "Constructing our History" resulted in the formation of the Coordinadora Nacional de Mujeres Indígenas (CNMI) (National Coordinating Committee of Indigenous Women) among communities from Chiapas, Guerrero, Hidalgo, Jalisco, Mexico City, Michoacán, Morelos, Oaxaca, Puebla, Querétaro, San Luis Potosí, Sonora, and Veracruz. The purpose of the organization is to strengthen from a gender perspective the leadership opportunities, networking potential and skills of indigenous women, within their communities and nationally, and sensitize indigenous peoples on indigenous women's human rights.

== Gender rebels ==
Mexico has a long history of "gender rebels" which according to archaeological, ethno-linguistic and historical studies of pre-contact include tribes of Albardaos, Aztec, Cipacingo, Itzá, Jaguaces, Maya, Pánuco, Sinaloa, Sonora, Tabasco, Tahus, Tlasca, and Yucatec peoples. During the colonial period, Sister Juana Inés de la Cruz wrote against patriarchy, the church's policy of denying education to women, and women's intellectual equality to men. She has been called one of Mexico's first feminists. Several women came out of the Mexican Revolution and refused to return to gender "normalty". These are typically isolated cases, and not indicative of a social or political movement.

=== Artists and writers ===
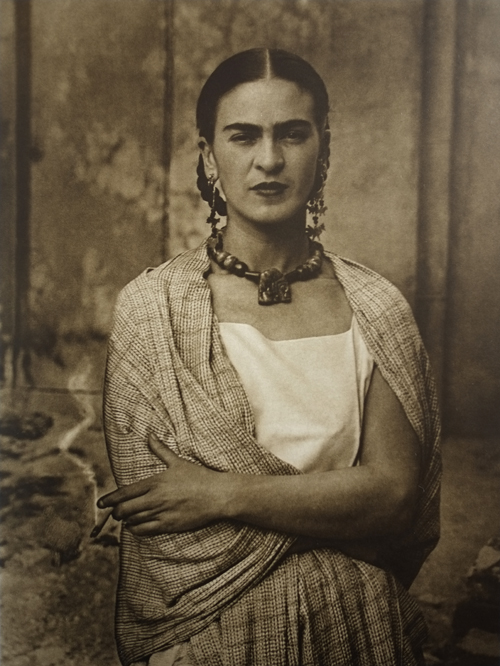
Frida Kahlo photographed in 1932 by her father, Guillermo

The countercultural artists movement of the post-Revolutionary period, beginning in the 1920s, was clearly political and aimed at allowing other voices in the development of a modern Mexico. In Guadalupe Marín's novel La Única (The Unique Woman) she speaks of violence against women, misogyny and lack of citizenship for women, but also feminine and homosexual desires. She presented publicly the understanding that sexuality has a political component. Frida Kahlo's work, blending both masculine and feminine gender perceptions, challenged false perceptions, as did Maria Izquierdo's insistence on her right to be independent of any state or cultural attempts to define her art. Tina Modotti's move away from portraiture and toward images of social change through the lens of realism and revolutionary action and Concha Michel's dedication to the rights and status of Mexican women, without challenging sexual inequality, represented a more humanist rather than feminist approach to their art. Whereas Michel explored feminism and politics with Anita Brenner, Modotti did not. The women were bound by their questioning of women's place in Mexico and society with their art, but they did not formally join with the suffragettes or in feminist organizations. In retrospect these artists have become feminist icons because their actions and work questioned gender restrictions, but in their time, they may not have seen themselves in that way.

Beginning in the 1970s, when Nancy Cárdenas declared her lesbianism on national television, activism increased, but mostly in small private gatherings. She founded the first gay organization in Mexico, organized the first Pride Parade, and both lectured and participated in media events, seminars, and congresses on feminism and sexuality. As early as 1975, at a seminar organized by Carla Stellweg to address feminist expression in Mexican art, psychologist and art historian Teresa del Conde was making arguments that biology did not dictate gender roles. By the mid-90s, almost half of the membership in feminist organizations was lesbian.

=== Muxe ===
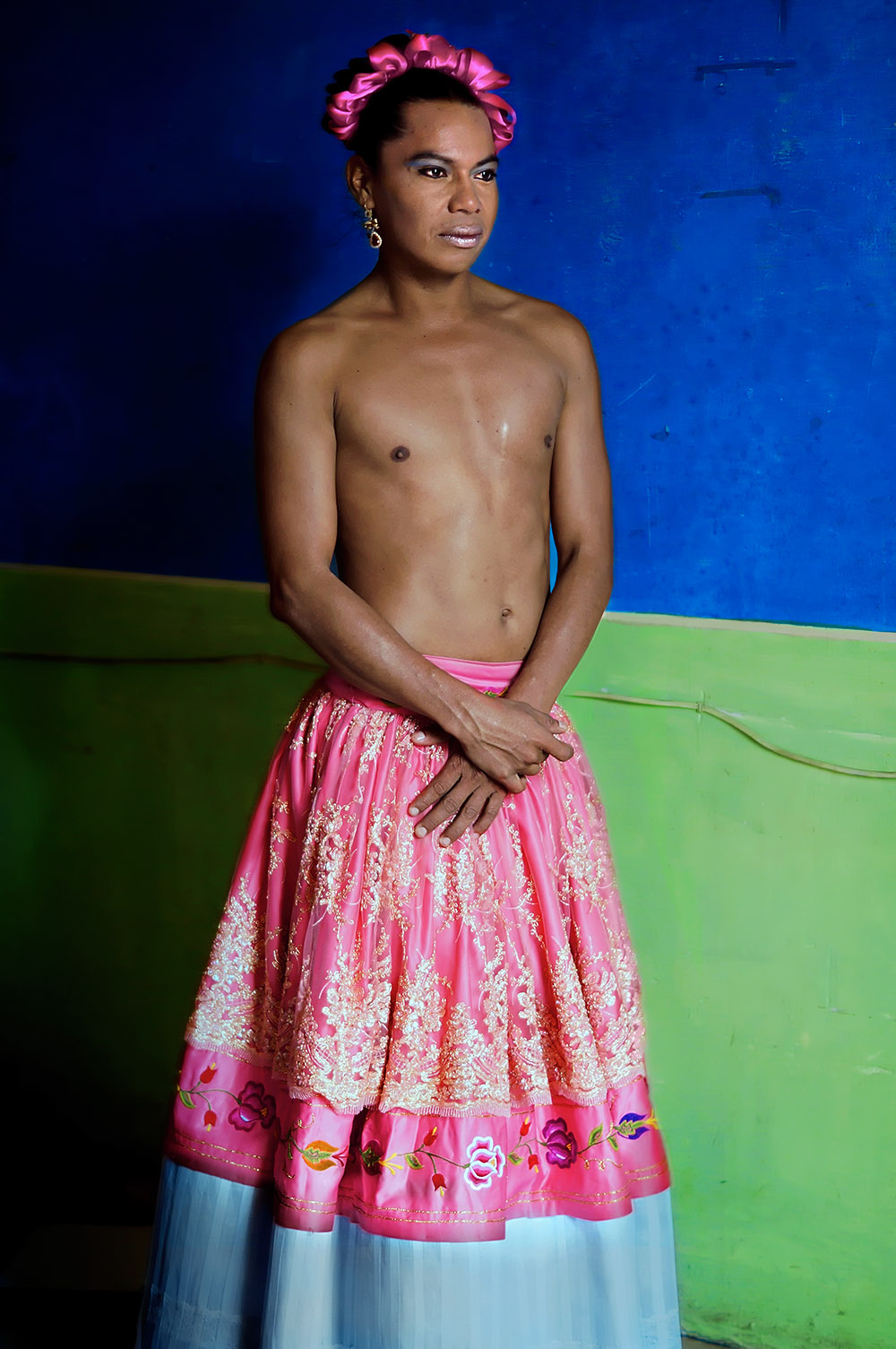
Lukas Avendano, a Zapotec muxe performance artist

The Zapotec cultures of the Isthmus of Oaxaca in Juchitán de Zaragoza and Teotitlán del Valle are home to a non-binary gender sometimes called a third gender, which has been accepted in their society since pre-conquest. The Muxe of Juchitán and biza'ah of Teotitlán del Valle are not considered homosexual but instead a separate category, with male physiology and, typically, the skills and aesthetics of women. According to Lynn Stephen in her study of Zapotec societies, muxe and biza'ah are sometimes disparaged by other men, but generally accepted by women in society.

The AIDs pandemic caused the coming together of the Muxe and feminist groups. Gunaxhi Guendanabani (Loves Life, in the Zapotec languages) was a small women's NGO operating in the area for two years when the muxe approached them and joined in the effort to promote safe sex and protect their community. On November 4, 2014, Gunaxhi Guendanabani celebrated its 20-year anniversary and their efforts in decreasing HIV/AIDs and gender-based violence, as well as its campaigns against discrimination for people living with HIV and against homophobia.

=== Nuns ===
In Mexico, where 6.34% of the female population has a child between the age of 15 and 19, there are some who make a conscious choice against motherhood. For some, becoming a nun offers a way out domesticity, machismo, and a lack of educational opportunity toward a more socially responsible path. Those in orders who see their work as allies of the poor and imbued with a mission for social justice have increasingly been characterized as feminists, even from a secular perspective. Mexico's nuns who work along the US/Mexico border with migrants experience difficulties trying to balance strict Catholic doctrine against suffering that they see and some believe the church needs to take a more humanitarian approach. Those religious who work to bring visibility to femicide and halt violence against women see beyond religious beliefs and call attention to the human dignity of victims. An organization called the Rede Latinoamericana de Católicas (Latin American Catholic Network) has gone so far as to send a letter to Pope Francis supporting feminism, women's rights to life and health, their quest for social justice and their rights to make their own choices regarding sexuality, reproduction and abortion.

== List of notable figures ==
- Elisa Acuña (1872–1946) – Mexican anarchist and educator, feminist and journalist, revolutionary and leader of the Mexican Cultural Missions against illiteracy
- Norma Alarcón – Chicana author, professor, and publisher in the US; founder of Third Woman Press and a major figure in Chicana feminism
- Norma Andrade – one of the founding members of Nuestras Hijas de Regreso a Casa A.C., a Mexican non-profit association of mothers whose daughters have been victims of female homicides in Ciudad Juárez
- Elena Arizmendi (1884–1949), founder of the Neutral White Cross during the Mexican Revolution, later edited the periodical Feminismo internacional
- Carmen Boullosa – Mexican poet, novelist and playwright whose work focuses on the issues of feminism and gender roles within a Latin American context
- Nancy Cárdenas (1934–1994) – Mexican actor and playwright who was one of the first Mexican people to publicly declare her homosexuality
- Elvia Carrillo Puerto (1878 – 1967) – Mexican socialist, politician, and feminist activist, who advocated free love at the First Pan-American Feminist Congress
- Rosario Castellanos Figueroa (1925–1974) – Mexican poet and author, who, along with the other members of the Generation of 1950 (the poets who wrote following the Second World War, was influenced by César Vallejo and others), was one of Mexico's most important literary voices in the last century
- Amalia González Caballero de Castillo Ledón (1902–1986) – president of the Inter-American Commission of Women; first woman diplomat in Mexico; was married to a prominent scholar, Luis Castillo Ledó
- Rita Cetina Gutiérrez (1846–1908) – Mexican teacher, poet and feminist who promoted secular education in the nineteenth century in Mérida, Yucatán; one of the first feminists and influenced the generation of young women who fueled the first wave of feminism in Mexico
- Comandanta Ramona (1959–2006) – Tzotzil Maya commander in the Zapatista Army of National Liberation Army
- Martha P. Cotera – librarian, writer, and influential activist of the Chicano Civil Rights Movement and the Chicana Feminist movement of the 1960s and 1970s
- Verónica Cruz Sánchez – first Mexican human rights activist to be awarded the Defender of Human Rights award from Human Rights Watch
- Anilú Elías – journalist, publicist, theoretical scholar, professor and feminist activist from Mexico City; has been on the front lines of the fight for reproductive rights of Mexican women
- Alaíde Foppa (1914 – c. 1980) – poet, writer, feminist, art critic, teacher and translator; born in Barcelona, Spain, she held Guatemalan citizenship and lived in exile in Mexico
- Hermila Galindo (1886–1954) – Mexican feminist and writer; one of the first feminists to state the Catholicism in Mexico was thwarting feminist efforts; first woman to run for elected office in Mexico
- Juana Belén Gutiérrez de Mendoza (1875–1942) – anarchist and feminist activist, typographer, journalist and poet born in San Juan del Río, Durango, Mexico; active in the Frente Unico Pro Derechos de la Mujer (FUPDM)
- Eulalia Guzmán (1890–1985) – pioneering feminist and educator and nationalist thinker in post-revolutionary Mexico; one of the first women to work in the field of Mexican archeology; Mexican delegate to the Pan-American women's conference in Baltimore, MD
- Astrid Hadad – well-known Mexican actress and performance artist; attended the National Autonomous University of Mexico (UNAM), originally planning to major in political science and journalism but changed to theatre
- Rosario Ibarra – activist and prominent figure in the politics of Mexico; first female candidate for the presidency; president of Comité Eureka de Desaparecidos ("The Eureka Committee of the Disappeared")
- Graciela Iturbide – Mexican photographer whose work has been exhibited internationally and is included in many major museum collections such as the San Francisco Museum of Modern Art and the Getty
- Estela Jiménez Esponda – Mexican professor, feminist, suffragist and women's rights activist who directed the newspaper Nosotras (Us) and was a leader in the development of the Communist Party
- Dolores Jiménez y Muro (1848–1925) – Mexican schoolteacher and revolutionary who rose to prominence during the Mexican Revolution as a Socialist activist and reformer and as a supporter and associate of General Emiliano Zapata
- Marta Lamas – Mexican anthropologist and political science professor at the National Autonomous University of Mexico (UNAM), and lecturer at the Instituto Tecnológico Autónomo de México (ITAM); one of Mexico's leading feminists and has written many books aimed at reducing discrimination by opening public discourse on feminism, gender, prostitution and abortion
- Patricia Mercado – Mexican feminist, politician, and a founder, former president and 2006 presidential candidate of the extinct Socialdemocratic Party (in Spanish: Partido Socialdemócrata)
- Maritza Morillas – contemporary painter from Mexico, well known in Mexico for her work dealing with the deaths in Ciudad Juárez, the mass murder of young women along the US-Mexico border
- Julia Nava de Ruisánchez (1883–1964) – Mexican writer, activist during the Mexican Revolution who is remembered for establishing the first Mexican institution for training social workers in 1936
- María del Refugio García (c. 1898–1970) – became well known as a radical speaker from an early age, important figure in the early struggle for women's rights in Mexico, who with Elvia Carrillo Puerto advocated leftist positions at the Congreso de Mujeres de la Raza (Congress for Hispanic Women) in 1925
- María Ríos Cárdenas – editor of the monthly periodical Mujer: Periódico independiente para la evaluación intelectual y moral de la mujer (1923–26); advocated that domestic work be salaried
- Antonieta Rivas Mercado (1900–1931) – Mexican intellectual, writer, feminist and arts patron
- Margarita Robles de Mendoza (1896–1954) – Mexican feminist and suffragette; one of the most vocal proponents for Mexican women's enfranchisement during the 1930s and 1940s and often seen as controversial
- Elena Torres Cuéllar (1893–1970) – leading Mexican revolutionary, feminist, progressive educator and writer; as a member of the communist party, in 1917 she was the only woman to participate on behalf of the Liga Central de Resistencia at the first meeting of the Yucatán Socialist Party in Mérida
- Laura N. Torres – early twentieth century Mexican journalist and founder of an early feminist society named "Admiradoras de Juárez."
- G. Sofía Villa de Buentello – Mexican feminist who worked in the first wave of the suffrage movement in Mexico; one of the first women to analyze the legal equality of men and women before the law; wrote La mujer y la ley: Estudio importantísmo para la mujer que desee su emancipación y para el hombre amante del bieny la justicia (1921)
- Andrea Villarreal (1881–1963) – Mexican revolutionary, journalist and feminist who was often referred to in the press as the Mexican Joan of Arc
- Teresa Villarreal (1883–died, date unknown) – active revolutionary labor and feminist organizer, supported the Partido Liberal Mexicano (PLM) during the Mexican Revolution of 1910–1917
- Leonor Villegas de Magnón (1876–1955) – political activist, teacher, and journalist; founded a brigade of the international Mexican American relief service, La Cruz Blanca, during the Mexican Revolution

== Social movements ==
- Mexico 68
- Women's liberation movement in North America#Mexico

== See also ==
- Feminism in Latin America
- Feminism in Argentina
- Feminism in Chile
- Chicana feminism
- Gender inequality in Mexico
- Women in Mexico
- Antimonumenta, memorial-like works installed by feminist groups in Mexico
- Violence against women in mexico
