= Women's suffrage in Mexico =

The struggle for women's right to vote in Mexico dates back to the nineteenth century, with the right being achieved in 1953.

== Late nineteenth century ==
The liberal Mexican Constitution of 1857 did not bar women from voting in Mexico or holding office, but "election laws restricted the suffrage to males, and in practice women did not participate nor demand a part in politics," with framers being indifferent to the issue.

Years of civil war and the French intervention delayed any consideration of women's role in Mexican political life, but during the Restored Republic and the Porfiriato (1876–1911), women began organizing to expand their civil rights, including suffrage. Socialist publications in Mexico began advocating changes in law and practice as early as 1878. The journal La Internacional articulated a detailed program of reform that aimed at "the emancipation, rehabilitation, and integral education of women." The era of the Porfiriato did not record changes in law regarding the status of women, but women began entering professions requiring higher education: law, medicine, and pharmacy (requiring a university degree), but also teaching. Liberalism placed great importance on secular education, so that the public school system ranks of the teaching profession expanded in the late nineteenth century, which benefited females wishing to teach and education for girls.

== Mexican Revolution ==
The status of women in Mexico became an issue during the Mexican Revolution, with Francisco I. Madero, the challenger to the continued presidency of Porfirio Diaz interested in the rights of Mexican women. Madero was part of a rich estate-owning family in the northern state of Coahuila, who had attended University of California, Berkeley briefly and traveled in Europe, absorbing liberal ideas and practices. Madero's wife as well as his female personal assistant, Soledad González, "unquestionably enhanced his interest in women's rights." González was one of the orphans that the Maderos adopted; she learned typing and stenography, and traveled to Mexico City following Madero's election as president in 1911. Madero's brief presidential term was tumultuous, and with no previous political experience, Madero was unable to forward the cause of women's suffrage.

Women played a big role in the Mexican Revolution. Mexican Women had different roles in the revolution that played a significant impact in the war. Known as soldaderas, or female soldiers, they participated in meal preparation, house chores, and some even fought on the battlefield. Females aided their husbands and provided support for their families. Some women followed their male counterparts and helped with the services and support for them. Society's perception of women directly impacted how women were perceived in the Mexican Revolution. They either joined the war, assisted with the needs of the soldiers, and or provided medical supplies or other resources. During this time, they assisted the needs of their male counterparts. According to Mexican standards, women were expected to be submissive to their partner and prioritize his needs at home or in preparation for battle. Machismo, or the sense of masculine pride made it difficult for women to receive any acknowledgement for their efforts in the war. The dictatorship of Proforio Diaz made it difficult for society to keep track of the war efforts of women. Therefore, most women continued to support their families without compensation. As a result of the Diaz dictatorship, different rebellious groups were created in response. These groups were spread along different geographical regions. In the north, Pancho Villa dominated his rebellious group and in the south, Madero dominated his. Women from different regions joined these rebellious groups. The uprising of these rebellions inspired women to pursue fighting in the war due to mass frustration and civil unrest. In Madero's group, women were praised for their involvement in which female colonels, known as coronelas, played an important role. Unlike the Zapatistas, Villa did not praise the war efforts of women. Villa believed that having females in his group had slowed the progress of his male soldiers. Male soldiers appreciated the company of the soldaderas, so Villa let the female soldiers march with them. Due to a battle in Chihuahua in 1917, Villa had killed 90 women because he had lost the battle. In response, society doubted the efforts of females in the war.

Following his ouster by military coup led by Victoriano Huerta and Madero's assassination, those taking up Madero's cause and legacy, the Constitutionalists (named after the liberal Constitution of 1857) began to discuss women's rights. Venustiano Carranza, former governor of Coahuila, and following Madero's assassination, the "first chief" of the Constitutionalists. Carranza also had an influential female private secretary, Hermila Galindo, who was a champion of women's rights in Mexico.

Carranza promulgated the Plan de Guadalupe in 1914. In the "Additions" to the Plan de Guadalupe, Carranza made some important statements that affected families and the status of women in regards to marriage. In December 1914, Carranza issued a decree that legalized divorce under certain circumstances. Although the decree did not lead to women's suffrage, it eased somewhat restrictions that still existed in the civil even after the nineteenth-century liberal La Reforma established the State's right to regulate marriage as a civil rather than an ecclesiastical matter.

=== Female Mexican revolutionaries ===
Valentina Ramirez, born in 1893 in Durango State, is known as a female fighter. In order to feel a sense of freedom, she fought in the war after her father died. She dressed up as a male, under the name Juan Ramirez since female soldiers were not allowed directly on the battlefield. Her sense of bravery and independence inspired many women to join the war. Her story inspired the creation of a corrido, “La Valentina”. In the corrido, it mentions the inequality she faced while fighting as a woman in the revolution. Her participation in the war was dismissed by the government since they did not want to recognize the efforts of women. Ramirez's bravery had earned her the nickname “Mexican Mulan” by the Mexican public. Like Ramirez, many soldaderas adopted male names and wore male clothing to protect their identity. By wearing male clothing, women felt protected against sexual violence in the war.

Other famous soldaderas include Angela Jimenez, who was known as Angel Jimenez. She dressed in male clothing and threatened those who tried to shame her. A prominent figure that symbolizes feminism is “La Adelita”. It is a revolutionary icon that depicts a provocative woman that is armed for war. By showing a woman wearing armed gear, it shows that they can be courageous as well. This depiction goes against the perception of women during the 1910s, in which women were seen as incapable of fighting alongside men. It was until after the revolution that Mexican Revolutionaries were recognized for their participation in the war.

== Activism ==
There was increased advocacy for women's rights in the late 1910s, with the founding of a new feminist magazine, Mujer Moderna, which ceased publication in 1919. Mexico saw several international women's rights congresses, the first being held in Mérida, Yucatán, in 1916. The International Congress of Women had some 700 delegates attend, but did not result in lasting changes.

Accessible through the “Diario Oficial'', the first feminist constitutional document for women’s rights was published in 1916. The document was written by 620 delegates and addressed women’s rights in Mexico through the collaboration of both male and female members. The named contributors of this publication in the “Diario Oficial'' of the government were director Antonio Ancona and administrator José Samboa Espinosa. Many sections detail equal educational access and opportunities for women in the workplace, and outline the importance of women in administrative positions and career prospects in modern life. The document writes about how the revolution of 1910 opened the doors for women and changed the way they had been viewed for twenty preceding centuries. Additionally, the document names educational institutions that were installed for women such as the “Escuela Vocacional de Artes Domésticas”, “El Instituto Literario de Niñas” of 1877, along with the “Escuela Normal de Profesoras” of 1912.

In 1915, President Carranza appointed Salvador Alvarado as military governor of Yucatán. Alvarado advocated for women's rights at all social class levels. For example, he increased access to medical services for women and sex workers. He increased educational opportunities for women of all social classes. He believed that higher education will allow females to receive higher status and respect. With more females receiving higher education, they were battling gender stereotypes by society during the 1910s. Since women were given more educational opportunities, they were able to seek jobs in government positions. This gave women more power and influence as they took important job positions. This increased the movement for suffrage of women after the revolution period. In 1922, Felipe Carrillo Puerto was appointed governor of Yucatán. Puerto wanted to help the most vulnerable groups such as women, so he implemented socialist policies to help Mexican females. He also advocated for women to receive higher education. Puerto allowed the right for women to divorce their spouses without needing their consent. These figures had helped the feminist movement and increased the journey to suffrage, after the revolution period.

As women's suffrage made progress in Great Britain and the United States, in Mexico there was an echo. Carranza, who was elected president in 1916, called for a convention to draft a new Mexican Constitution that incorporated gains for particular groups, such as the industrial working class and the peasantry seeking land reform. It also incorporated increased restrictions on the Roman Catholic Church in Mexico, an extension of the anticlericalism in the Constitution of 1857. The Constitution of 1917 did not explicitly empower women's access to the ballot.

In the northern Mexican state of Sonora, Mexican women pushed for more rights for women, including the vote. Emélida Carrillo and school teacher María de Jesús Váldez led the effort. Notably, the movement for Mexican women's rights there was linked to the movement to exclude and expel Chinese in Mexico, racial essentialism that was also seen in the suffrage movement in the U.S., but generally not elsewhere in Latin America.

=== 1968 student movement ===
The 1968 student movement led by the National Strike Council contributed towards strides for gender equality in Mexico. The students’ efforts towards equality of the genders increased awareness towards democratic rights facilitating social change. Following the student movement in Mexico, support towards female participation in various forms of expression such as cultural, artistic, political, and academic contributions increased. For example, they paved the way for the first addition of women in positions of political power, namely as governors and ministers of state, deputies, senators, and judiciaries. These movements raised the cognizance of the public both in the realm of local and national political environments and social relations.

Although the majority of the movement's participants were male, there were a plethora of women involved in the protests as well. A quote from Ana Ignacio Avendaño, the head of the School of Law in 1968 conveys, “...the true heroines of the student movement: those anonymous women whose names aren’t well known, who go unrecognized. But some of them gave their lives. If we have gained democratic freedo ms, it’s due to them.” There were five female participants, most recognized were representatives of the UNAM School of Law, Ignacia (La Nacha) Rodríguez Márquez and María Esther (La Tita) Rodriguez. They were both activists and were involved in brigades and assemblies at their schools. Ignacia Rodríguez was later detained and put in the Santa Martha Acatitla prison for over two years, along with María Esther Rodríguez, due to their efforts. 13 other women who were members of the National Strike Council are as follows: Dana Aerenlund, Patricia Best, Adriana Corona, Oralia García, Mirthokleia González, Mareta Gutiérrez, Consuelo Hernández, Ianira León, Eugenia Mesta, Erlinda Sánchez, Marta Servín, Eugenia Valero, and Rosalba Zúñiga. Along with these participants, hundreds of women were active in the movement through their participation in debates during assemblies on campuses. While the content of their debates was not centered around feminist proposals, their presence in collaborative spaces opened doors for female contributions and involvement. These women did not go to prison as a result of their efforts.

=== Indigenous feminist movements ===
One indigenous-centered movement in Mexico is the Zapatista movement. The principles of the movement revolve around dismantling systems of colonization, exploitation, and injustice committed against indigenous communities for centuries. The Zapatista uprising that occurred on January 1, 1994, called for justice and the right to democracy for Indigenous peasants in the south of the country. In the time following their uprising, the EZLN (Ejército Zapatista de Liberación Nacional) or Zapatista Army of National Liberation, focused on contributing to the liberation of Indigenous people in Mexico through actions such as facilitating peaceful protests and opening the line of communication between organizations in the public sphere. Their modern efforts work to achieve economic, political, and cultural autonomy for Indigenous communities, including the goal of reconstructing the prominent gender roles and expectations set for Indigenous Mexican women.

The Zapatista movement was a driving force for the development of social movements in indigenous communities, including feminist efforts in Mexico. The instrumental position women had in the Zapatista movement led to their increased exposure and influence in society. For example, in Chiapas, the efforts of Zapatista women in leadership positions along with support from women in the Zapatista base conjoined to transform the laws, institutions, autonomy, gender roles and expectations, and domestic violence cases of Zapatista women who were involved in the movement.

Activism was sparked in part due to the interaction between various groups with the common goal of expanding the freedom of Indigenous communities and women. The association with Zapatista women and indigenous feminism led to the creation of spaces that allow for open discussion and collaboration between women in Mexico. Their role in the feminist movement was more openly discussed and developed through the installation of the National Coordinating Committee of Indigenous Women in 1997. Indigenous women contribute directly to the progression of the movement, such as Marta, a Mixtec woman who is a member of an organization named Et Naazwiihy (The Space We Live In) along with Alma López, a Quiché woman who is a council member of the City of Quetzaltenango in Guatemala.

== 1916-1953 ==
In 1916, during the Mexican revolution, the very first Feminist Congress of Yucatán met. The women there discussed and demanded equality so that responsibly help men build a new Mexican society. Yucatán was the first state to recognize women's right to vote in 1923. The women were soon forced to resign from the positions they had obtained. In 1937, Mexican feminists challenged the wording of the Constitution concerning who is eligible for citizenship – the Constitution did not specify "men and women." María del Refugio García ran for election as a Sole Front for Women's Rights candidate for her home district, Uruapan. García won by a huge margin, but was not allowed to take her seat because the government would have to amend the Constitution. In response, García went on a hunger strike outside President Lázaro Cárdenas's residence in Mexico City for 11 days in August 1937. Cárdenas responded by promising to change Article 34 in the Constitution that September. By December, the amendment had been passed by congress, and women were granted full citizenship.

A growing concern among members of Cárdenas's party around the debate of women's suffrage was that enfranchising women would give power to Mexico's conservative factions, and women would vote against the country's ongoing revolutionary politics. Cárdenas, who had at this point been an advocate for women's rights and suffrage for years, saw the push for women's right to vote as a matter of justice and progress, and believed that Mexico would intrinsicly benefit as a nation from the reform. In 1937, he proposed a constitutional amendment that would establish women's suffrage into national law; this amendment, despite being passed through the Senate and a majority of state legislatures, ultimately failed to get ratified.

Later, in 1947, President Miguel Alemán proposed a constitutional amendment that would let women exercise their right to participate in municipal elections. Upon assuming the presidency, Adolfo Ruíz Cortines fulfilled his campaign promise and sent an initiative to reform Constitutional Articles 34 and 115 that promoted universal suffrage for women to the Chamber of Deputies. However, the vote for women in Mexico was not granted until 1953. The history and meaning of the women's vote in Mexico has been the subject of some recent scholarly research.

== See also ==
- Feminism in Mexico
- Women's suffrage
- Women in Mexico
- Soldaderas
