= Esponda =

Esponda is a surname. Notable people with the surname include:

- Estela Jiménez Esponda (fl. 1920s–1950s), Mexican professor, journalist, feminist, suffragist and women's rights activist
- Lara Esponda (born 2005), Argentine footballer
- Reese Esponda (born 2008), American artistic gymnast
