= Sofía Villa de Buentello =

Mexican feminist

Gerónima Sofía Villa de Buentello (1892 in Teocaltiche, Mexico — February 7, 1958 in Mexico City, Mexico) was a Mexican feminist who worked in the first wave of the suffrage movement in Mexico and was one of the first women to analyze the legal equality of men and women before the law. She founded the Women of the [Hispanic] race and led the faction of more moderate feminists in the 1920s in Mexico.

== Biography ==
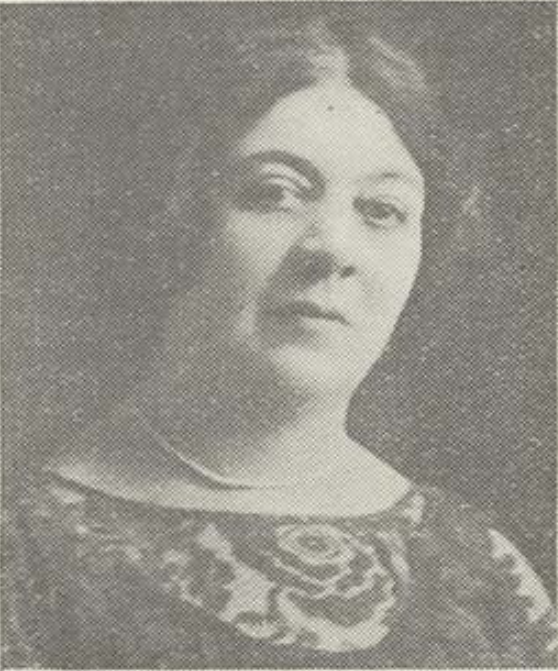
Sofía Villa de Buentello

G. Sofía Villa de Buentello was a Mexican feminist. She was probably a teacher, as most of the attendees at the 1916 First Feminist Congress of Yucatán were teachers and it was a requirement of attendance that women be educated. Her publications list her as a "professor" and other sources state she was a lawyer, though she indicated in a 1925 interview with The New York Times that she had only a secondary education. Married and a mother — her books are dedicated to her husband, Edmundo E. Buentello, and her children Miguel Edmundo and Sofía — Villa de Buentello was not a submissive wife. She publicly called for a change in women’s marital dependency and the domestic limits placed by society upon women.

Soon after the Congresses, in 1917 President Carranza’s “Law on Family Affairs (Domestic Relations)” was passed. In her analysis of the legislation, Villa pointed out that prior to its passage, the Civil Code was discriminatory. In the event that a child was born out of wedlock, if a woman who gave up her child to prevent stigma and shaming, she alone could be identified. The previous law had allowed maternity investigations so that orphans could find their birth mothers, but forbade paternity investigations.

In 1921 she published a book, La Mujer y la Ley (The Woman and the Law), which asked whether men and women were equal before the law in Mexico. Though the analysis was moderate in tone, Villa de Buentello stated that regardless of social or economic status, everyone must be viewed equally before the law. Considering that women did not have suffrage, it was considered revolutionary. She may have been influenced by Genaro García, a lawyer who had made a similar statement 30 years earlier, according to Carmen Ramos Escandón.

While Villa de Buentello was known for her less radical ideas, she was not truly a moderate. She and Elena Arizmendi Mejia established a cooperative union "Mujeres de la raza" (Women of the [Hispanic] Race) in 1923 with aims of uniting Latina women in the struggle for rights. At the time, Latin America was seen as the next "staging ground" as suffrage had been gained in Europe and the United States, but it was clear to Arizmendi after her attendance at the 1922 Pan-American Conference of Women that there was a lack of understanding from the Anglo-oriented perspective on Hispanic women's cultural influences. Villa and Arizmendi both saw matrimony and motherhood, an integral part of Latina identity, as making the experience of women "complete".

That same year, she participated in the National Convention of Women held on May 27, 1923, in Mexico City. The conference was organized by the Pan American League and quickly split into two factions. The radical contingent from Yucatán, which urged the convention to adopt a program advocating the abolition of marriage, birth control, free love, and sex education, were aligned with Elena Torres Cuéllar and María “Cuca” del Refugio García. Villa rejected this premise and instead sought legal rights for women inside of marriage. She believed divorce caused stigma for women and was against it because even if innocent of wrongdoing, in a divorce the wife was deemed to have behaved inappropriately and punished by society. Her more moderate stance gained her support by the faction composed of teachers, Christian women’s society members, the delegation of the Pan American League and members from US associations.

At the close of the National Convention on Women, Villa and Arizmendi determined to hold a conference for the Mujeres de la raza and organized a meeting for the International League of Iberian and Latin American Women for 1925. Arizmendi used her press contracts and secured coverage in the New York Times to promote the event. On Sunday, March 2, 1924, an extensive article about the feminist movement in Mexico entitled “New Women of Mexico Striving for Equality” carried an interview with Villa de Buentello giving an overview of their goals. The meeting occurred in July, 1925 in Mexico City with Villa as President of the conference. Arizmendi served as Secretary General, but did not attend due to a difference of opinion with Villa. In attendance were Rosa Maria Anders, a Cuban lawyer; Carmen Burgos of Spain; Natalia Costa de Gori, of Guatemala; Eva Maria V. de Gytina, of Panama; and María de Jesús Montenegro of Nicaragua, among others. From within Mexico were delegates from Oaxaca, San Luis Potosí, Magdalena Salazar Venegas with the National University, Rosaura Sansores with the Liga de Maestros (Teachers League) from Morelos, and Rosa Torre González from the government of Yucatán.

Villa came into conflict as before with "Cuca" Garcia and the more radical delegates over her views on marriage. During heated discussion, Villa closed the conference. There was protest by the delegates, who refused to accept her autocratic decision and continued working. The final twelve resolutions were founded upon traditions and morals, one even proposing that older women serve as moral guides for younger women during outings. They asked for civil, legal, social and economic equality, as well as the right to vote and hold public office.

Villa de Buentello’s work shows the contradictions which existed for this group of feminists. On the one hand, she wanted to expand the sphere of women, but on the other, she wanted to remain within the bounds of tradition. She wanted a woman's strengths and ability to work to be recognized, but only so that they could give her the freedom to express herself within marriage and motherhood. She challenged the notion of male leadership, but at the same time acknowledged the husband as head of the household. She argued for equality under the law, but only so that women would have protections within their marriages, no matter how bad those marriages might be.

In 1929, Villa petitioned President Emilio Portes Gil to allow women to count the ballots in the November elections.

== Selected works ==
- La Mujer y la Ley. Pequeña parte tomada de la obra en preparación titulada "¡La Esclava se Levanta!. Estudio importantisimo para la mujer que desee su emancipación y para el hombre amante del bien y de la justicia, Mexico, Talleres de la Imprenta Franco Mexicana, 1921 (in Spanish)
- La verdad sobre el matrimonio ... estudio importantisimo sobre la triste condicion de la mujer en el matrimonio, Mexico, Talleres de la Imprenta Franco Mexicana, 1923 (in Spanish)
- Derechos civiles de la mujer y ley de relaciones familiares, Mexico, 1923 (in Spanish)
