= Gender inequality in Mexico =

The Gender gap index for Mexico compared to other countries. Gender gap index is one of many multi-dimensional measures of gender inequality. Mexico was scored at 0.69 by World Economic Forum, and ranked 68 out of 136 countries in 2013.

Gender inequality in Mexico refers to disparate freedoms in health, education, and economic and political abilities between men and women in Mexico. It has been diminishing throughout history, but continues to persist in many forms including the disparity in women's political representation and participation, the gender pay gap, and high rates of domestic violence and femicide. As of 2026, the World Economic Forum ranks Mexico 18th in terms of gender equality out of 145 countries. Structural gender inequality is relatively homogeneous between the Mexican states as there are very few regional differences in the inequalities present.

== Gender statistics ==
The following table compares the population wide data for two genders on various inequality statistical measures, according to the most recent data available from The World Bank's Gender Statistics database. Unemployment statistics are calculated based on the International Labour Organization (or ILO)'s method of calculation.

Gender Statistic Measure	Females (Mexico)	Males (Mexico)	Total (Mexico)	Females (Latin America) (Note: This group draws from the World Bank's "Latin America & Caribbean" aggregate, labeled as "Latin America" for brevity.)	Males (Latin America)	Total (Latin America)	Females (World)	Males (World)	Total (World)
Infant mortality rate (per 1,000 live births) in 2023	11.2	13.6	12.4	12.1	15.0	13.6	25.9	30.6	28.4
Life expectancy at birth (years) in 2023	77.8	72.2	75.1	78.5	72.8	75.6	75.8	71.0	73.3
Expected years of schooling in 2023	15.3	14.1	14.7	15.8	14.4	15.1	12.7	12.6	12.7
Primary completion rate (% of relevant age group) in 2023	103.9	103.7	103.8	96.7	96.3	96.5	86.8	87.8	87.3
Primary education, teachers (%) in 2023	70.3	29.7	100.0	78.5	21.5	100.0	68.9	31.1	100.0
Lower secondary completion rate (%) in 2023	90.9	86.9	88.9	83.9	79.4	81.6	77.4	77.3	77.4
Secondary education, pupils (%) in 2017	51.1	48.9	100.0	50.14	49.86	100.0	47.95	52.05	100.0
Secondary education, teachers (%) in 2023	53.7	46.3	100.0	59.5	40.5	100.0	55.9	44.1	100.0
Account ownership at a financial institution, (% age 15+) in 2017	33.3	41.1	36.9	52.03	58.59	55.14	64.85	72.27	68.52
Unemployment, (% of that gender's labor force, modeled ILO estimate) in 2023	2.8	2.7	2.8	7.4	5.3	6.2	5.0	4.7	4.8
Unemployment, youth (% of labor force ages 15–24, modeled ILO estimate) in 2023	6.4	5.5	5.8	15.8	11.8	13.4	14.5	13.1	13.4
Ratio of female to male youth unemployment rate (% ages 15–24, modeled ILO estimate) in 2023	115.9			132.3			114.2		
Employment in agriculture, (% of employment of that gender) in 2023	4.8	16.8	12.0	7.3	17.3	13.1	26.7	26.5	26.6
Employment in industry, (% of employment of that gender) in 2023	17.6	30.0	25.0	12.1	26.6	20.6	15.8	28.7	23.5
Employment in services, (% of employment of that gender) in 2023	77.6	53.2	63.0	80.6	56.1	66.2	57.5	44.9	49.9
Self-employed, (% of employment of that gender) in 2023	31.4	31.3	31.4	34.5	37.3	36.2	45.5	47.4	46.6
Cause of death, by non-communicable diseases, ages 15–59, (%) in 2021	51.2	40.0	43.8	52.1	37.4	42.5	57.2	50.4	53.0
Fertility rate, total (births per woman) in 2023	1.9			1.8			2.2		
Literacy rate, adults (% of that gender ages 15 and above) in 2023	95.2	96.5	95.8	94.6	95.1	94.8	84.4	90.8	87.6
Literacy rate, youth (% of that gender ages 15–24) in 2023	99.3	99.1	99.2	98.8	98.4	98.6	91.8	94.1	93.0
Maternal mortality ratio (per 100,000 live births, modeled estimate) in 2023	42.0			77.00			197.00		
Sex ratio at birth (male births per female births) in 2023	1.0			1.0			1.1		
Seats held in national parliaments (%) in 2023	50.0	50.0	100.0	35.7	64.3	100.0	26.7	73.3	100.0

== Global rankings ==
Various groups have ranked gender inequalities around the world. For example, the World Economic Forum publishes a Global Gender Gap Index score for each nation every year. The index focuses not on empowerment of women, but on the relative gap between men and women in four fundamental categories – economic participation, educational attainment, health and survival, and political empowerment. It includes measures such as estimated sex selective abortion, number of years the nation had a female head of state, female to male literacy rate, estimated income ratio of female to male in the nation, and several other relative gender statistic measures. It does not include factors such as crime rates against women versus men, domestic violence, honor killings or such factors. Where data is unavailable or difficult to collect, World Economic Forum uses old data or makes a best estimate to calculate the nation's Global Gap Index (GGI).

According to the World Economic Forum's Gender Gap Index (GGI) for 2026, Mexico was ranked 18th out of 145 countries for gender equality. It was ranked 117th in economic participation and opportunity, 65th in educational attainment, 8th in political empowerment, and 1st in health and survival.

The purpose of the Human Development Report is to change the focus of development economics and encourage countries to focus more on the individual development of all its people and less on national income and gross domestic product. The Human Development Report determines which capabilities are most important in its ranking system by considering whether they are universally valued by large groups of people and whether they are basic, and would therefore hinder the realization of other capabilities. The index tries to put forth a more gender-sensitive public policy agenda by including gender equality and specific types of discrimination that affect the lives of women in developing countries as main focuses.

The United Nations' Gender Inequality Index (part of the Human Development Report) for 2016 had Mexico ranked 77th out of 188 countries for gender equality. Mexico's ranking on this index had gone down from its 2013 rank of 66th. This rank had gone up from its rank in 2012, which was 72nd. This is an improvement from its ranking in 2010, when it ranked 68th out of 169 countries.

== Economic inequalities ==
=== Labor participation ===
As of 1995, women made up only 29% of Mexico's economically active population and 23% of the wage earning economically active population. Since the 1990s, the number of women in the Mexican workforce has greatly increased while men's participation in the workforce has decreased. The actual percentages of employed versus unemployed women averages about 30-35%, while the percentage of employed men averages around 70%.

In addition, according to a study conducted by Margarita Valdés, 6% of those women in the workforce are either employed in the informal sector where they do not have a fixed salary or in the home-based industries sector where they receive no salary. More women are employed performing unpaid yet socially important and vital jobs than are men.

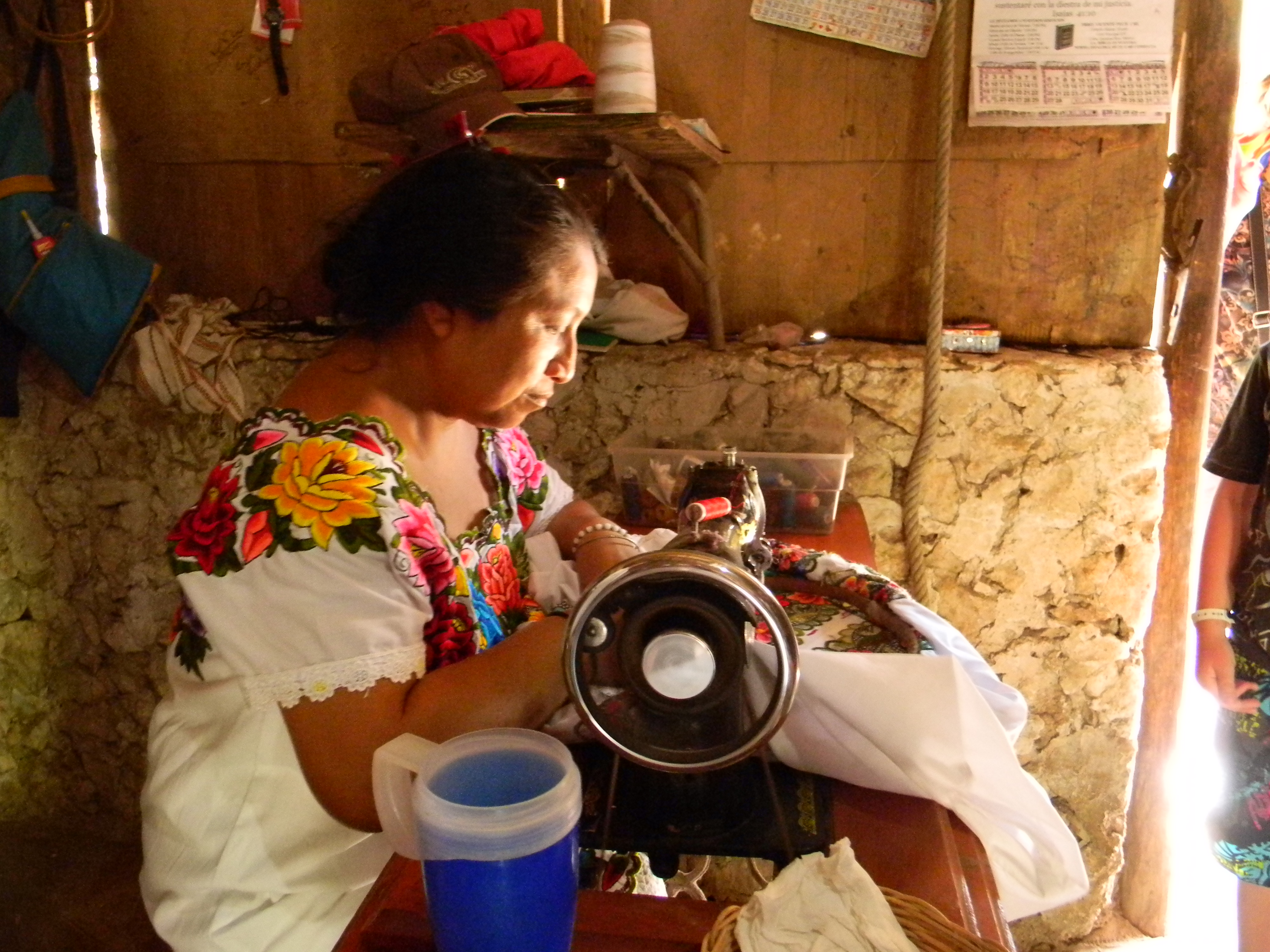
A Maya woman, souvenir maker.

Many women work in maquiladoras, or export-based manufacturing operations. The maquiladora labor force is largely made up of women, even though women went from making up 80% of the labor force in the 1980s to only 58.8% by 2006. However, this does vary by region. Due to the declination of wages in the export manufacturing sector over time, maquila industry salaries do not cover the basic basket needs of their workers.

Because these salaries are insufficient, workers often find it necessary to supplement them with informal work. Maquiladoras also frequently use pregnancy tests in order to ensure they do not hire pregnant women. This fear tactic is also often used to frighten hired workers to not get pregnant in order to retain their employment. In addition, according to a 2004 study by Alex Covarrubias and Gabriela Grijalva that took place in Sonora (northern Mexico), twenty percent of maquiladora workers had been victims of sexual harassment by male co-workers, supervisors, and managers.

Another study found that in professional and technical occupations, there are about 65 women to every 100 men. This study also found that the greatest economic gender inequality exists in business ownership, with 17 businesses owned by women to every 100 businesses owned by men.

Even though the rural laborer gender ratio is about equal, employment rates for women in the Mexican rural labor market are much lower than those of men. Studies also suggests that many women in rural communities feel that formal paid labor outside the home directly conflicts with the traditional role of women as homemakers.

=== Occupational segregation by gender ===
Occupational gender segregation takes the form of both horizontal segregation- the unequal gender distribution across occupations- and vertical segregation- the overrepresentation of men in higher positions in both traditionally male and traditionally female fields.

While occupational segregation exists in Mexico, segregation decreased between 1987 and 1993 from an occupational segregation index score of 26.6 to 23.5. This means that 23.5% of women or 76.5% of men would have to move to different career field in order for all occupations to have equal gender composition.

=== Pay gap ===
While the disparity between male and female wages decreased from the 1980s to the early 1990s, the gap began to increase again in 1996 following the Mexican economic crisis. According to the International Trade Union Confederation, the overall wage gap in Mexico as of 2008 is 17.4%. The gap varies by occupation; female teachers in Mexico make 91.2% of the salary of male teachers, while female industrial supervisors make only 66.9% of the wages earned by their male counterparts.

== Education inequalities ==
As of 2026, the World Economic Forum ranks Mexico 65th out of 145 countries in terms of gender equality in education attainment. In 2012, Mexico ranked 75th in equality in literacy rates, tied for first (at parity) in equality in primary and secondary education enrollment, and 98th in equality in tertiary education enrollment. This disparity is more prevalent for girls in low-income families, as these children are more likely to participate in domestic activities in the home rather than attend school.

A study conducted by Sonia Frias found that in many Mexican states, the number of average years of education is at parity for men and women and literacy rates are nearly equal (100 literate men to 98 literate women); the gap, however, increases in college and graduate education, with 78 and 54 women to 100 men respectively. This study also found that there were only 31 women to every 100 men in STEM fields of education. In addition, as of 1995, 15% of the female population of Mexico is illiterate.

Mexico is one of the few countries where the government has taken sexual stereotypes out of textbooks.

A study of young children in Mexico came to the conclusion that because the young girls tend to be doing work in the home that is not considered a part of the formal labor force, they are not protected by government policies designed to protect their education. Policies and projects like these are usually conducted and focus on youth with formal employers, so many young girls are unable to attend school or even be contacted by the government to ensure that they are receiving an education because they are completing housework in their homes.

Mexico is also one of only three OECD countries, the others being Switzerland and Turkey, where more men than women have obtained a tertiary education.

== Health inequalities ==
=== Abortion ===
Since 2024, 75% of the states have decriminalized abortion, yet states like Guanajuato have had their Congress vote against the decriminalization of abortion. However, the Supreme Court has upheld the constitutionality of laws permitting abortion until the 12th week of pregnancy. The only case where the federal government mandates access to abortion and emergency contraception is in the case of rape. However, many women face barriers to receiving this care including: inaccurate information, undue delays, and intimidation by officials.

Studies also show that many Mexicans do not know accurate information about the legality of abortion in their country; often, they believe that abortion is not legal under any circumstance and thus do not know how to receive a safe abortion should they need one. The lack of access to safe and legal abortions leads to complications from unsafe abortions, which is estimated by the World Health Organization to be either the third or fourth highest cause of maternal mortality.

=== Gender-based violence ===
Mexico has the 16th highest rate of homicides committed against women, also known as femicide, in the world. This rate has been on the rise since 2007. In addition, the state of Mexico has one of the highest rates of domestic violence at 53%. Femicide and gender violence is also more prevalent in regions along the Mexico-US border and in areas of high drug trading activity and drug violence.

According to the 2013 Human Rights Watch, many women do not seek out legal redress after being victims of domestic violence and sexual assault because "the severity of punishments for some sexual offenses contingent on the "chastity" of the victim" and "those who do report them are generally met with suspicion, apathy, and disrespect."

According to a 1997 study by Kaja Finkler, domestic abuse "is embedded in gender and marital relations fostered in Mexican women's dependence on their spouses for subsistence and for self-esteem, sustained by ideologies of romantic love, by family structure and residential arrangements." A study released in March, 2018, found that 40.6% of employed women in Mexico City had reported some form of work-related disruption due to domestic violence.

The exploitation through sex trafficking and forced prostitution increases the risk that a woman in Mexico will experience gender-based violence. It is thought that about 400 women enter into prostitution in Mexico City every day, and that eighty percent of those women are entering into prostitution against their will. A study by Arun Kumar Acharya suggests that because of sex trafficking victims' inability to protect themselves from forced, unprotected sex at the threat of violence by madams, pimps, and others in power positions over them, sex trafficking victims are the most vulnerable to gender-based violence.

=== STDs ===
In poorer regions of Mexico with large indigenous communities also experience high levels of STDs and health problems; for example, at least 778 women in the state of Oaxaca, one-third of the population of which is indigenous, died during pregnancy, childbirth or postpartum between 1995 and 2004.

Sexual health and STDs are also big issues faced by those who have been forcibly entered into prostitution and sex trafficking. This is usually because sex trafficking and forced prostitution victims are unable to consistently negotiate condom use with their male partners at the threat of violence, which leads to an increase in HIV/AIDS and other STD exposure. This has also contributed to the stigmatization of these women as carriers of HIV/AIDS and STDs.

== Political inequalities ==
=== Political participation ===
Historically, women were underrepresented in comparison to the general population, in virtually every level of the Mexican government. According to a 1998 study, women held only 14.2 percent of parliamentary seats in Mexico, putting it behind most developed countries (with the exception of the United States) in female representation.

However, through the implementation of systems like gender quotas and gender parity, both horizontal and vertical, women have slowly begun to establish themselves in every level of government, including the judicial and executive branches. Even then, with the introduction of gender quotas in the late 1990s, men stood as the majority and used loopholes to prevent and diminish the power of women in Mexican politics. One instance in which loopholes were utilized to disregard gender quotas was through the use of "Juanitas", women that "graciously resigned" from their elected role leaving room for their male alternatives to take over. Adaption of gender quotas was not necessarily a voluntarily thing for many parties, as most were merely afraid of making their resistance visible, perhaps due to potential backlash from media and the public.

Nonetheless, Claudia Sheinbaum became Mexico's first female president as a result of the 2024 election. Her presidency has shown that gender inequality in Mexican politics is decreasing in certain aspects due to actions by legislators to enforce rules and tools that decrease gender inequality.

A 2004 study suggests that girls in Mexico think political participation is as important as boys do, but because of their socialized belief that politics is a masculine career field, these children do not intend to seek a career in politics. Even when Mexican women can enter male-dominated fields, they still face barriers. Barriers like a lack of institutional support, social sigma, and even a sense of guilt for not spending enough time with their family. According to several women interviewed across various leadership roles, they are more likely than their male counterparts to be unable to accept odd working hours or make sacrifices due to home responsibilities like child caring. Moreover, they have a higher possibility of being passed for promotions due to their perceived gender role as a mother, wife, or daughter.

=== Social life ===
Researcher Margarita Valdés noted that while there are few inequalities enforced by law or policy in Mexico, there are gender inequalities perpetuated by social structures and expectations that limit the capabilities of Mexican women; these inequalities are largely maintained by local patriarchal social structures that deny women the possibility of functioning in many different areas. These patriarchal social structures include ideas of women being less capable than men due to sexist views of their ability to handle stress or pressure. The prominence of such thinking often leads to women themselves refraining from competing for higher roles.

== Government policies ==
Mexico's Supreme Court declared marital rape illegal in November 2005. The Mexican government adopted the General Act on Equality between Women and Men which was intended to establish a connect between the federal and the state level in the creation of policies and legal provisions in relation to gender equality in 2006.

The government social welfare program Oportunidades provides more assistance to families with daughters in order to create more incentives for their families to send them to school. Mexico has also earmarked funds, as of 2010, in order to "incorporate the gender dimension in educational programmes and initiatives."

However, according to Rupert Knox, researcher on Mexico at Amnesty International, "In the past years, Mexico has approved a number of laws and institutions designed to protect women from discrimination and violence. Much of the problem, however, lies in the lack of effective implementation of these laws and the weakness of the institutions."

== See also ==
- Women in Mexico
- Human rights in Mexico
- Feminism in Mexico
- Chicana Feminism
