= Laureana Wright de Kleinhans =

Mexican writer and feminist pioneer

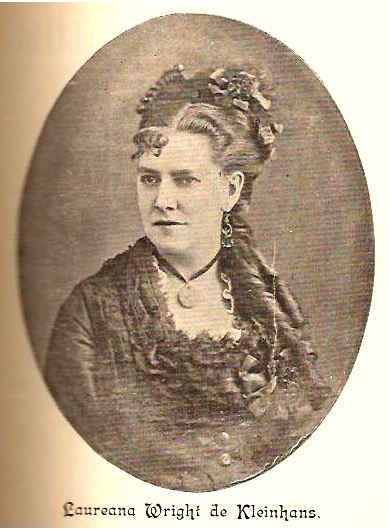
- Born: Laureana Wright González; 4 July 1846; Taxco, Guerrero, Mexico
- Died: 22 September 1896 (aged 50); Mexico City, Mexico
- Occupation: feminist
- Years active: 1912–1955

Laureana Wright de Kleinhans (4 July 1846 – 22 September 1896), simply known as Laurena, was a Mexican writer and feminist pioneer. Her writings on the role of women, were revolutionary for her time. Her magazine, Violets of Anahuac in 1887, changed the paradigm by promoting as the core ideology of the magazine, the feminine ideal of a cultured, educated wife and mother. The publication promoted female education and insisted that the intellectual equality between men and women was the means of emancipation. She was one of the first feminist theorists in Mexico, asking women to question their role in society and the conditions in which they lived. She covered topics such as education, women's suffrage and legal equality between men and women. She wrote patriotic poetry and served as the vice president of the Spiritualist Society of Mexico, which she joined because one of its principles held that men and women were of equal intelligence.

== Biography ==
Laureana Wright González was born on 4 July 1846 in Taxco, Guerrero, Mexico to American father James Wright and his Guerreran wife, Eulalia González. The family relocated to Mexico City, for better economic opportunities when Wright was a child and there learned Spanish, English and French. From the age of sixteen, she studied literature, philosophy and history with teachers such as Ignacio Ramírez, Ignacio Manuel Altamirano, Francisco Pimentel and José María Vigil and in 1865, she began writing patriotic poetry.

In 1868, she married Sebastian Kleinhans, with whom she had a daughter, Margaret. She divorced one year after the marriage and devoted her time to writing. De Kleinhans was one of the first Mexican writers to express that women should have a public voice and should be educated. She postulated that by keeping women ignorant, they were treated no better than property. She discussed the social impacts of inequality and the lack of legal provisions, which led to women's subjugation. She was a journalist for publications such as El Monitor Republicano, El Bien Público and El álbum de la mujer. Despite her friendship with Delfina Ortega Diaz, the president's first wife, she was almost expelled from the country for her collaboration with the Diario del Hogar, criticizing the labor policy of President Porfirio Diaz.

In 1869, she was admitted as an honorary member of the Society of Nezahualcoyotl, at the request of its founders, Manuel Acuña and Gerardo M. Silva. She joined the scientific society El Porvenir in 1872, where she published several of her poems. In 1873, she was appointed to the membership of the Liceo Hidalgo, a literary society in which almost all intellectuals in Mexico gathered, at the request of Ignacio Ramírez and Francisco Pimentel. In 1885 de Kleinhans became a member of the Liceo Mexicano, as well as the Liceo Altamirano of Oaxaca. At that time, almost all literary societies were male dominated. For women to have a public voice, they felt that it was imperative to speak in the educated style of men, thus de Kleinhans sought memberships that would give her literary standing.

In 1884 she founded and directed the magazine Violetas de Anáhuac (Violets of the Anahuac); "Anáhuac" is an Aztec word for the geographical area around Mexico City. In 1887 she founded the newspaper Mujeres de Anáhuac (Anahuac Women). Violets was a revolutionary journal for its time, as rather than promoting the culture of domesticity, the aim of the journal was to promote female education and to assert that women and men were intellectually equal. To bring home the point that women were capable of remarkable achievement, the journal collected and printed biographies of Mexican women, including such notable Mexicans as Sister Juana Inés de la Cruz and the second wife of Mexican President Porfirio Díaz, Carmen Romero Rubio de Díaz. It also included the histories of 29 indigenous women, which was a definitive break from the typical Euro-centric histories written at that time.

Although de Kleinhans did not believe in spiritualism when she first encountered it, and denounced it in the Violetas de Anáhuac, she became a follower of Allan Kardec because of his belief that men and women had equal intelligence. She ended up being a fervent follower of Kardecian spiritualism, and became vice president of the Spiritualist Society of Mexico. She also explored Freemasonry which in the nineteenth century was being heralded as a means of removing the influences of the Catholic Church. She ultimately rejected the organization because they refused to acknowledge the equality of men and women and in fact had an initiation oath which declared "never admit to their ranks a blind man, a madman, or a woman".

She died 22 September 1896 in Mexico City, Mexico.

Mujeres notables mexicanas (1910) was released posthumously. It is an important work, as it is a collection of the biographies de Kleinhans had assembled of distinguished Mexican women. It contains 116 biographies, beginning with pre-conquest subjects and extending to the second half of the nineteenth century. It was one of the few books which included women as a part of the history of Mexico before the twentieth century.

== Selected works ==
=== Poems ===
- "A Cuba"
- "El 5 de mayo de 1862"

=== Books ===
- Violetas del Anáhuac: periódico literario: redactado por señoras (1888) (In Spanish) Available at Biblioteca Nacional de Mexico (OCLC #651191638)
- La emancipación de la Mujer por medio del estudio Imprenta nueva: Mexico (1891) (In Spanish)
- Educación errónea de la mujer y medios prácticos para correjirla Imprenta nueva: Mexico (1892) (In Spanish)
- Mujeres notables mexicanas Tipografía económica: Mexico (1910) (In Spanish)
