= María Luisa Martínez de García Rojas =

María Luisa Martínez de García Rojas (1780 – 1817) was an insurgent involved in the Mexican War of Independence. Born in Erongarícuaro, Michoacán, she was the wife of Esteban García Rojas “El Jaranero”, a member of a regionally important family involved in the production of jaranas; both ran a small store. She joined the rebels as a spy provided reports. Her dispatches were found by authorities and she was fined and jailed several times. The last time she was imprisoned she was ordered to pay a larger fine, unable to do so, she was executed in Erongaricuaro, Michoachán in 1817.
