= HIV/AIDS in Mexico =

In 2016, the prevalence rate of HIV/AIDS in adults aged 15–49 was 0.3%, relatively low for a developing country. This low prevalence has been maintained, as in 2006, the HIV prevalence in Mexico was estimated at around 0.3% as well. The infected population is remains mainly concentrated among high risk populations, men who have sex with other men, intravenous drug users, and commercial sex workers. The prison population in Mexico, faces a fairly similar low rate of around 0.7%. Among the population of prisoners, around 2% are known to be infected with HIV. Sex workers, male and female, face an HIV prevalence of around 7%. Men who have sex with other men have a prevalence of 17.4%. Other highest risk-factor group in México is the transgender people; with 17.4% of prevalence. Around 90% of new infections occur by sex-related methods of transmission. Of these known infected populations, around 60% of living infected people are known to be on anti-retroviral therapy (ART).

== Drivers of transmission ==
=== Men Who Have Sex With Men ===
The AIDS epidemic is concentrated primarily among men who have sex with men (MSM), sex workers and their clients, and intravenous drug users. Results of a 2006 study by Bravo-Garcia et al. reported by UNAIDS indicate that sex between men accounts for 57 percent of the HIV infections. Mexico's National Center for HIV/AIDS Prevention and Control (CENSIDA) estimates that HIV prevalence among MSM was 10 to 13.5 percent in 2006. Results from studies in 2006 by Gayet et al., Magis et al., and the Biological Behavioral Surveillance Survey conducted in Mexico showed that HIV prevalence rates among male sex workers were 25 percent in Monterrey, 20 percent in Guadalajara and Mexico City, and 12 percent in Ciudad Nezahualcóyotl.

=== Intravenous Drug Users ===
A gradual shift is occurring toward higher rates of infection among both injecting drug users and women, and rates are also rising among female sex workers. A 2004–2006 study by Patterson et al. in 2006 showed that HIV prevalence in Tijuana and Ciudad Juárez, cities on the U.S. border, was 6 percent among female sex workers and 16 percent among injecting drug users. Research by Gayet et al. in 2006 also showed that HIV prevalence among male long-distance truck drivers in Monterrey was 0.7 percent, double the estimated national adult HIV prevalence.

More than one-quarter of them had paid for sex in the previous year and one-sixth of them had never used a condom. The role of injecting drug users in Mexico's epidemic is difficult to determine, but an association with drug use has been observed in cities along the border with the United States, where the spread of HIV through the sharing of drug-injecting equipment is of growing concern.

=== Population Mobility ===
Population mobility is a factor in HIV/AIDS transmission in Mexico. Though the overall infection prevalence is relatively low nationwide, the prevalence of HIV in border cities is disproportionately higher. Border cities, such as Tijuana and Ciudad Juarez are major sites of drug trafficking, sex trafficking, and commercial sex work and tourism. About 90% of the methamphetamine and 30% of the heroin in the United States was made in Mexico and smuggled in through the border.

Cross-border activity, including immigration from Central America and the influx of those returning from migrant work in the United States, has contributed to the spread of the epidemic, particularly in rural parts of the country. Mobile populations are at higher risk of HIV infection because of poverty, violence, lack of access to health services, increased risk-taking behavior, rape, loneliness, and the availability of sex workers. Migrant work between the United States and Mexico has been common among Mexican workers searching for seasonal work, often in agriculture. The wealth disparity that exists between Mexico and the United States creates an economy between the two countries in which large numbers of Mexican workers are constantly seeking work on the other side of the border due to economic and political instability in the Mexican government.

In Mexico in particular, the income gap that exists between the upper and lower classes is severe, and issues of poverty plague areas throughout the country. In general, there are large concentrations of high-risk populations moving to and from the border cities of Mexico and the United States. "Tijuana and San Diego share the busiest land-border crossing in the world, with 45.9 million northbound legal border crossings in 2006 alone. Considerable bidirectional mobility exists among high-risk populations at this international border crossing."

=== Heterosexual Transmission ===
Although the epidemic in Mexico remains concentrated, it could become generalized due to high-risk behaviors in the general population. There are signs that heterosexual transmission of HIV is increasing as more women are being infected. According to a recent population-based survey by the National Council for HIV/AIDS Prevention and Control, in 2001, 15 percent of married and cohabitating men reported extrarelational sex during the last year, and only 9 percent of them used a condom at last intercourse. Eighty percent of these men perceived no HIV risk from their behavior.

Mexican women are at risk for HIV infection because they often are unable to negotiate condom use. In Mexican culture, machismo and traditional values, in which women are subservient to the men in their lives, places women in inferior positions in society. According to published research by Olivarrieta and Sotelo (1996) and others, the prevalence of domestic violence in Mexico varies between 30 and 60 percent. In this context, requesting condom use with a stable partner is perceived as a sign of infidelity and asking to use a condom can result in domestic violence.

=== Urban Concentration ===
HIV infection in Mexico is concentrated in urban areas, where more than 77 percent of the population lives. Most HIV prevention programs focus on urban populations. There are efforts to reach out to rural, mobile, and indigenous populations.

=== Tuberculosis Co-infection ===
The potential for HIV-tuberculosis co-infection is also a concern in Mexico, as it is in other countries. Studies have shown tuberculosis to be the second most frequent infection in AIDS patients in Mexico. It is more prevalent in urban centers among injecting drug users and individuals of lower socioeconomic status. According to the World Health Organization (WHO), the incidence of tuberculosis is 10 cases per 100,000 population and 1.1 % of adults diagnosed with tuberculosis were found to be HIV-positive in 2006.

Tuberculosis co-infection is known to be the leading killer of all AIDS-related diseases in the world. (cite) Both tuberculosis and HIV suppress the immune system in complex ways that are still not completely known to the medical community. When the two infect the body together, oftentimes the infections will exacerbate each other, making treatment more complicated.

== Border cities ==
=== Commercial Sex Workers ===
According to studies, the prevalence of HIV among female sex workers in Mexican border cities has increased within the last decade. In a study conducted in Tijuana and Ciudad Juarez, 55 out of 924, 6%, female sex workers tested positive for HIV. The average age of the female sex workers was 32, only about 19% spoke English, and the majority of them had little to no education. Among female sex workers in border cities, exposure to and use of intravenous drugs with clients greatly increases risk of HIV infection. "Female sex workers who used stimulants had greater odds of HIV infection, even if they did not inject. Injection drug use and sex work have been shown to overlap considerably in various settings".

=== Intravenous Drug Users ===
Mexico's border cities account for the majority of intravenous drugs, methamphetamine and heroine, that are trafficked into the United States. Much of the cities, economy is an informal one, made up of different groups, all contributing to the drug trade. These groups include, gangs, drug dealers, corrupt police, corrupt government officials, immigrants who traffic the drugs across the border on foot, and sex workers, who by way of their clients, are indirectly involved. As a result of this informal economy dominating the cities and corrupting municipal processes, rates of intravenous drug usage is atypically high.

The urban poor in Mexico is often exacerbated due to high unemployment rates and lack of stability in government resources. Involvement in the informal economy is oftentimes unavoidable for many, especially those who are impoverished. In border cities, a great majority of the urban poor is made up of men and women who were living in the United States in an undocumented state and have since been deported, sometimes multiple times, and are ostracized from their families and jobs in the United States.

Many of these deportees were forced to leave the United States with little notice, without any money or belongings, and no resources or plans to rely on when they are displaced back into Mexico. As a result, many of these deportees are forced to find work wherever possible, without any resources or aid from the United States or Mexican government. Many are forced to resort to commercial sex work or drug trafficking, therefore, increasing the high risk populations that exist.

== Discrimination ==
Another challenge Mexico currently faces is unequal access to quality care and the need to train health workers and clinics in using antiretroviral treatment.[2] The spread of HIV/AIDS in Mexico is exacerbated by stigma and discrimination, which act as a barrier to prevention, testing, and treatment. The 2001 UNGASS declaration stated that "stigma, silence, discrimination and denial, together with lack of confidentiality, weaken the prevention efforts, care and treatment." Stigma and discrimination occur within families, health services, the police, and the workplace.

A study conducted by Infante-Xibille in 2004 of 373 health care providers in three states in Mexico described discrimination within health services. HIV testing was conducted only with perceived high-risk groups, often without informed consent. Patients with AIDS were often isolated. A 2005 five-city participatory community assessment by Colectivo Sol, a nongovernmental organization, found that some HIV hospital patients had a sign over their beds stating they were HIV-positive. There was also discrimination in the workplace. In León, Guanajuato, researchers found that seven out of 10 people in the study had lost their jobs because of their HIV status. The same study also documented evidence of discrimination that MSM experienced within their families.[2]

== National response ==
=== Condonetas ===
In response to the fact that less than 46% of men who have sex with men and less than 41% of intravenous drug users in Tijuana having reported taking an HIV test, the Federal Ministry of Health, implemented an outreach program known as condonetas in several cities to improve prevention tactics. Condonetasare mobile clinics, or vans, that drive around and hand out various resources to high risk communities to educate individuals about their risks and directly give them assistance. Condonetas are equipped with fast response HIV tests, condoms, clean needles, alcohol wipes, and bottles of bleach to clean the needles if they are going to be shared.

These mobile clinics are brightly decorated, adorned with cartoon condoms, and loud speakers. In essence, condonetas are attempting to go against the conservatism of Mexican societal norms and bring sex education to the people instead of allowing them to remain uninformed and at risk. "Health officials say this year in Tijuana alone, the condonetas will hand out more than one-million condoms, and more than 50,000 clean syringes."

=== Government Recognition ===
Mexico has a national policy on HIV/AIDS treatment and has made notable gains in providing access to antiretroviral treatment for people infected with HIV. Since 2003, Mexico has been providing universal access to antiretroviral treatment through the national health system. Although the WHO/UNAIDS/UNICEF report Towards Universal Access states that 76 percent of HIV-infected people who needed it were receiving antiretroviral treatment in December 2006, the government indicates that everyone identified with advanced disease is receiving treatment.

Mexico was also successful in securing the blood supply early on, and no cases of HIV have been detected recently through this mode of transmission. CENSIDA has been active since 1988 and collaborates with other government entities as well as with nongovernmental organizations, including organizations of persons living with HIV/AIDS. This collaboration is a significant asset in the national response to HIV/AIDS, because a coordinated response between government and civil society has proven to be more effective than government entities acting alone.

Mexico established a national network of HIV/AIDS ambulatory health care facilities known as Centros Ambulatorios Para la Prevencion y Atencion en SIDA e ITS (CAPASITS). The CAPASITS are the result of collaboration among local governments, the national government, and nongovernmental organizations and provide comprehensive community-based attention and treatment free of charge to people with HIV.

In a landmark decision in February 2007, the Supreme Court ruled that it was unconstitutional for the military to discharge 11 HIV-positive soldiers and deny them access to military health services. The court ruled that being HIV-positive does not in itself imply an inability to serve in the armed forces and that the military must decide on a case-by-case basis whether or not a soldier can remain in active service. The ruling establishes a precedent allowing dismissed soldiers to seek redress in federal appeals court.

== See also ==
- HIV/AIDS in North America
