= Sociedad Protectora de la Mujer =

Mexican women's organization

Sociedad Protectora de la Mujer (English: Society for the Protection of Women), was a women's organization in Mexico, founded in 1904.

Sociedad Protectora de la Mujer has been referred to as the first feminist women's rights organization in Mexico. The Sociedad supported the introduction of women's suffrage and promoted women's rights.

The organization published the pioneering feminist publication "La Mujer Mexicana" (1904-1906).
