= Estela Jiménez Esponda =

- Born: Estela Jiménez Esponda; Chiapas, Mexico
- Occupations: teacher, feminist, suffragette, politician
- Years active: 1920s-1950s

Estela Jiménez Esponda was a Mexican professor, feminist, suffragist and women's rights activist. She directed the newspaper Nosotras (Us) and was a leader in the development of the Communist Party.

During the elections and early tenure of President Lázaro Cárdenas when it appeared he was supportive of women's achievement of the vote, Jiménez served as a sector leader of Party of the Mexican Revolution (PRM) and was involved in the Frente Unico Pro Derechos de la Mujer (FUPDM) (United Front for Women‟s Rights). The FUPDM, which had begun in the 1920s, declined after the unsuccessful ratification of the amendment to Article 34 of the Constitution granting enfranchisement to women. Jiménez tried to revive the work, leading the PRM's Women's Block (1943), without much success especially when the party reorganized as PRI and she moved further left. As she saw the effects of malnutrition, labor laws which worked against women, and lack of laws to protect women and children, her ideology became more in line with the communist and socialist parties of Mexico.

She participated as an alternate delegate at the "round table of Mexican Marxists held in 1947 and in 1948 she was pushed out of the PRI. In 1955 she ran as a candidate for federal deputy for the Communist Party for the Sixth District of Mexico. She also was a member of the Ministry of Women's Action of the Federation of Employees of the State or FSTSE alongside Gloria Barrera, Maria del Refugio Garcia, Josefina Vicens and Francisca Zárate.
