= Verónica Cruz Sánchez =

Mexican human rights activist (born 1971)

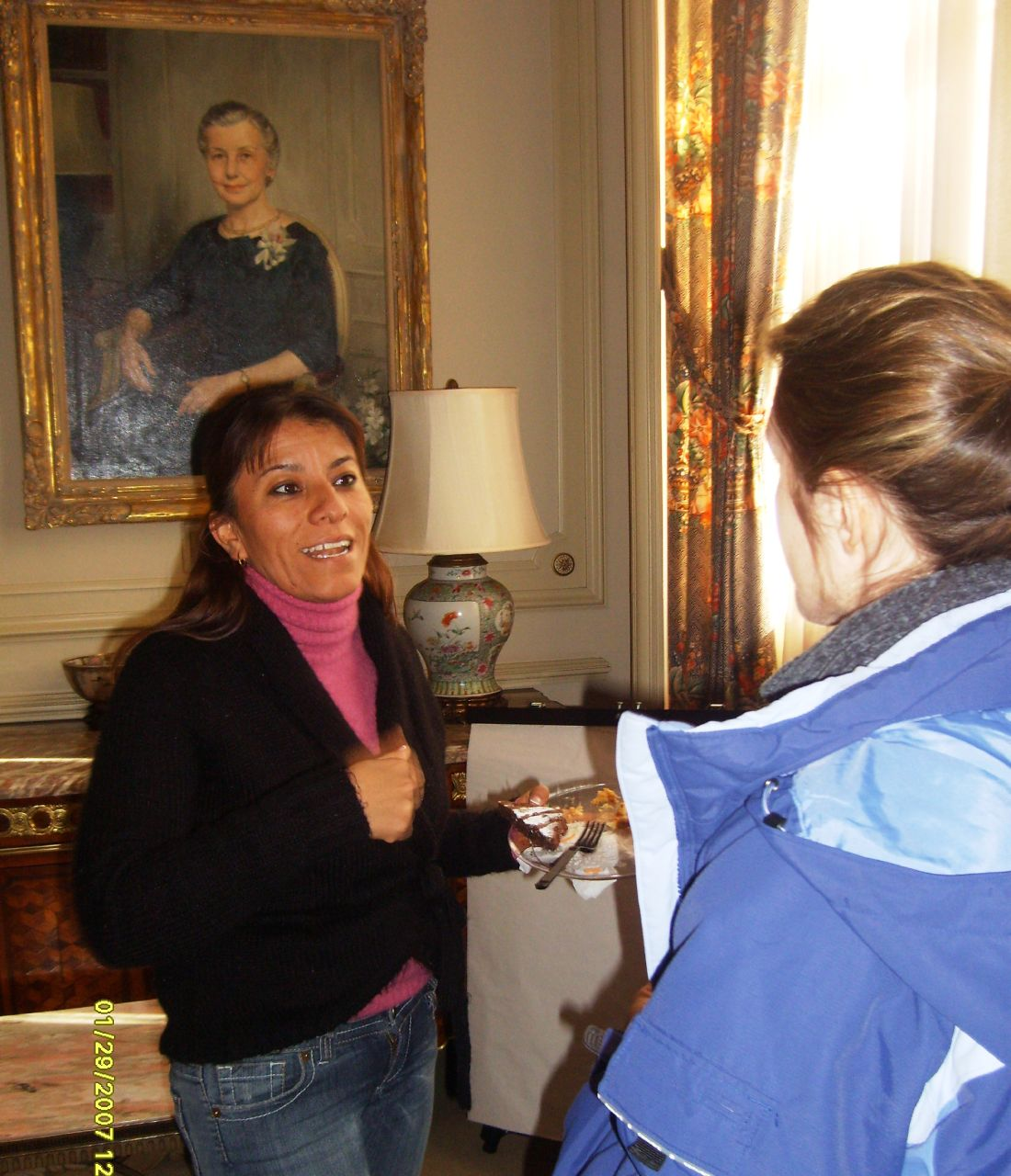
- Sánchez in 2007
- Born: Verónica Cruz Sánchez; February 1, 1971 (age 54); León, Guanajuato, Mexico
- Occupation: Human rights defender

Verónica Cruz Sánchez (born February 1, 1971) is a Mexican human rights defender. She was the first Mexican to be awarded the Defender of Human Rights award from Human Rights Watch. In 2006, she was awarded the honor for her work with women's right to access legal and medical services. She brings public awareness to the situation of predominantly uneducated, indigenous and impoverished women who are imprisoned for abortion and miscarriage in Mexico. Cruz has worked to decriminalize and destigmatize women's decisions over their bodies and reproductive rights. She is founder of Las Libres, an organization dedicated to the defense, guarantee and respect of human rights for women in the state of Guanajuato and across Mexico.

== History ==
She was born on February 1, 1971, in León, Guanajuato and while still in high school spent her evenings going door to door to teach women to read and write. In the process, she learned stories of the violence they suffered and knew she had found her life’s work.

Cruz pursued a degree in social work from the José Cardijn School of Social Work in León and later obtained a B.A. in International Commerce from the Instituto Politécnico Nacional. She studied a Masters in Organizational Development at the University of Guanajuato. After graduating, she worked as a social worker in a preschool and at an organization called Rural Development of Guanajuato, which is now defunct. In 1995, Cruz began working as regional (and then a national) coordinator for a network of NGOs under the umbrella of the feminist organization Millennium.

== Body self-determination ==
In 2001, she and other activists founded an organization called Las Libres (the Free Women) to advocate for women's rights to make decisions about their bodies, their reproductive choices and their sexuality. She has been active in promoting free and safe abortions to victims of rape and incest, though in many states of Mexico, incest is seen as a consensual, rather than a criminal, relationship.

Cruz was the first Mexican human rights activist to be awarded the Defender of Human Rights award from Human Rights Watch. In 2006, she was awarded the honor for her work with women's right to access legal and medical services.

To destigmatize abortion, Cruz developed a program where trained volunteers accompany women throughout their medical procedures lending them support. Counseling services are available, as well as physical support whether they have decided to terminate a pregnancy outside the formal health system or in a clinic in Mexico City. Mexico City is the only place in the nation where an abortion can be obtained for a pregnancy which was not the result of rape. In 2014, Cruz produced a short documentary film, Accompaniment, to demonstrate how the model they have developed is used to both support women and reduce stigma.

== The Guanajuato Seven ==
In 2008, she and other activists began interviewing women who were incarcerated and collected statistics on the reasons for their imprisonment. They discovered that women were being imprisoned for up to 30 years in some cases under a charge of "aggravated homicide of a family member." In reviewing the law code, Cruz discovered that this offense was not a crime which was defined in the legal statutes. Cruz and Las Libres assisted in funding and support for the 2010 legal proceedings that reduced the sentences of the women to 3 years, which all had already served, and reformed state legislation. The women were not exonerated, but their punishments were deemed to be excessively punitive. In 2014, Cruz co-produced a documentary telling the stories of these women entitled Las Libres la historia después de (The Free [Women]: The Story Continues).

== Violence against women ==
Cruz has agitated for stronger legislation for sexual violence and insisted that the laws which are in place are enforced. She has pushed authorities to recognize the extent of femicide in Mexico, as well as gender violence. According to federal statistics, one-quarter of the women in Guanajuato have experienced discrimination and harassment at work and the state has been ranked first in the nation in family violence in 2010, 2012 and 2013 and second in 2011. 59 percent of women in Guanajuato age 15 and older have experienced violence. Cruz uses these statistics to educate others about the situations women face, but also women themselves. As sex is often considered a taboo topic and sexual education is not presented in schools, educating women about their bodies, their pleasure and their rights has become a focus of her work. As women have realized that they can be active participants instead of passive partners, relationships over the last ten years have become more egalitarian in Guanajuato. Cruz's activism has led to her work being widely recognised (as well as receiving local harassment). In 2010 she was described as one of the "most dangerous women in the world" by More magazine. She founded Las Libres in 2000; feminist organization in Guanajuato which remains one of Mexico's most conservative and retrograde states. In 2010, 9 women were freed from Guanajuato prisons. They had been jailed for having spontaneous abortions, with sentences of up to 35 years.

== Other states ==
Because of the success of Cruz and Las Libres in Guanajuato, the organization has expanded into the Mexican states of Guerrero, Querétaro and San Luis Potosí. In 2011, they were successful in obtaining the release in Guerrero of an indigenous woman who had been imprisoned without trial for over 3 years on the charge of "aggravated homicide of a family member". Cruz championed a second case from Guerrero, that was elevated to the Supreme Court of Justice of the Nation (SCJN) which ordered the immediate release of the woman, as the method used to determine murder rather than a miscarriage was not scientifically established.

In conjunction with the Global Fund for Women, Cruz and Las Libres have also founded an umbrella organization, Articulación Interestatal Por el Derecho A Decidir de las Mexicanas, which works in various Mexican states to decriminalize and reduce stigma about women's rights. They seek legal policy change, improvement in quality and access to medical and legal resources, and public dialogue aimed at shifting opinion away from punitive measures. Articulación has made network connections with women's groups in the Caribbean and Latin America, sharing strategies and developmental ideology.

In November 2014, the SCJN began hearings on a case from Veracruz. Cruz reported that it was the first case in Mexico to ask the court to consider whether women have a constitutional right to abortion and whether criminalization should be eliminated across the nation.
