= María del Refugio García =

Mexican activist (1889-1973)

María del Refugio García (1889 – 1973) is an important figure in the early struggle for women's rights in Mexico.

== Early life ==
García was born in lake region of Uruapan in Mexico, where her father was a village doctor. She made her first speech to the country people when she was a girl, described as still wearing short skirts and braids down her back. She urged her audience to defend themselves against the tyranny of the dictator, President Díaz. Her reputation as a radical speaker became well known.

== Politics ==
At the first Mexican congress held in Mexico City in 1934, García endorsed Marxist thinking that prostitution was caused by poverty and would never be eradicated while a capitalist system prevailed. She called for grassroots campaigning to ameliorate the conditions of poverty in which people lived and to educate women. García believed that self-respect could only be gained through equal pay for equal work and that women would not need to turn to prostitution if they had access to cheaper food, state housing, child care facilities, free school, textbooks, and school meals. García regularly contributed to Machete, the journal of the Mexican Communist Party. In 1935 she was a cofounder of the Sole Front for Women’s Rights. She worked with radical groups for women’s suffrage and the right to stand for office – they called for amendments to the civil code that would allow women equal political rights. They also argued for the agrarian code to be modified to allow women the right to apply for government land grants. She also addressed worker’s rights, calling for all women to be allowed maternity rights, for indigenous women to be encouraged to take their place in society and politics, and for unemployed women to be helped by establishing work center. At its height, the Sole Front had a membership of 50,000 women, taking in over 800 women’s groups.

== 1937 election ==
In 1937, Mexican feminists challenged the wording of the Constitution concerning who is eligible for citizenship - the constitution did not specify “men and women.” They fought for women's right to vote. García ran for election as a Sole Front candidate for her home district, Uruapan, to the Mexican Chamber of Deputies. She won by a huge margin, but was not allowed to take her seat because the government would have to amend the Constitution first. In response, García went on a hunger strike outside President Lázaro Cárdenas’ residence in Mexico City for 11 days in August 1937. Cárdenas responded by promising to change Article 34 in the constitution that September. By December, the amendment had been passed by Congress, and women were granted full citizenship. However, the vote for women in Mexico was not granted until 1958.

== Teaching ==
García taught at La Huerta Agricultural School, where she gave seminars on scientific materialism and other radical doctrines.

== Death and legacy ==
García is remembered as one of the most genuinely popular women in Mexico. Despite her high-profile campaigning, she died, probably destitute, sometime in the 1970s. Today her name appears mainly in specialist books on Mexican history of the early twentieth century.
