= Teresita de Barbieri =

Uruguayan sociologist

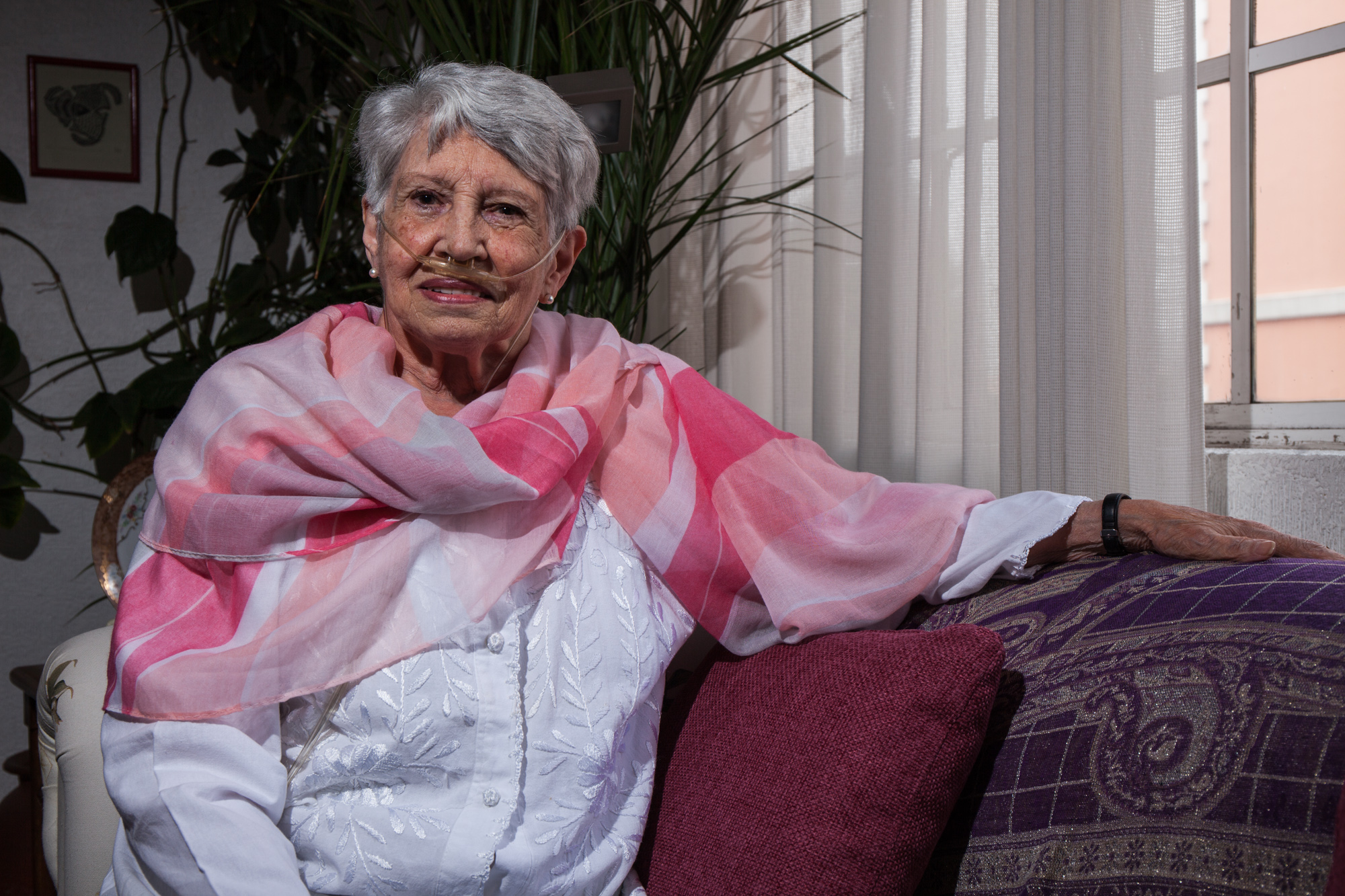
- Teresita de Barbieri, 2015
- Born: Martha Teresita de Barbieri García; October 2, 1937; Montevideo, Uruguay
- Died: January 21, 2018 (aged 80); Mexico City, Mexico
- Occupations: feminist sociologist; academic; researcher
- Awards: Sor Juana Inés de la Cruz Recognition

Academic background
- Education: University of the Republic

Academic work
- Discipline: Gender studies
- Institutions: National Autonomous University of Mexico; Latin American Faculty of Social Sciences
- Main interests: Condition of women in Latin America

Teresita de Barbieri García (October 2, 1937 – January 21, 2018) was an Uruguayan feminist sociologist, academic, and researcher based in Mexico. A researcher in social sciences and gender studies, she was a pioneer in research on the condition of women in Latin America from the Social Research Institute of the National Autonomous University of Mexico (UNAM). A socialist militant, she survived the 1973 Chilean coup d'état and went into exile in Mexico where she developed her research career. A sociologist at the Latin American Faculty of Social Sciences (FLACSO), she researched the daily life of women, the Latin American feminist movement, reproductive health, secularism and, in particular, population and development. She wrote articles for various newspapers and magazines, including Fem magazine and the "La Doble Jornada supplement" of La Jornada newspaper, as well as for Cimacnoticias (CIMAC).

== Early life and education ==
Martha Teresita de Barbieri García was born in Montevideo, Uruguay. While her parents and siblings lived in Colonia, she lived at her grandmother's house in the capital between the ages of two and six because of her health problems with tuberculosis. At the age of six, she returned with her parents to Colonia where she completed her elementary school studies. She began her university education at the University of the Republic (UDELAR). Her first studies were in Law and Art History. At the age of 21, she entered the School of Social Work from which she graduated as a social worker. She also began to be politically active in socialism. She traveled several times to Cuba, in 1959, during the Cuban Revolution.

She came to sociology through a seminar in the Faculty of Humanities on sociological research. In 1968, she moved to Santiago de Chile to begin a master's in sociology at FLACSO. In 1972, she published her master's thesis entitled: El acceso de la mujer a las carreras y ocupaciones tecnológicas de nivel medio (Santiago de Chile, 1972).

== Career and research ==
Among her first research work on women was a UNESCO project in Chile to evaluate a secondary education program for women: she chose schools for girls in Valparaíso, Talca, and Valdivia. Then she discovered – Barbieri explained in an interview at CIMAC – that there was almost no bibliography "that had to do with women or the female sex"; she reflected on the fact that women had to assume all the work of domestic burden, child care, and so forth. She resided in Chile during the government of Salvador Allende and, after the coup d'état, she went to Buenos Aires, and a month later, she traveled with her family to Mexico, where she settled in 1973.

In Mexico, she initiated contact with feminist movement leaders such as Lourdes Arizpe, Marta Lamas, Antonieta Rascón, and Carmen Lugo. In 1979, Barbieri began to contribute to Fem, a feminist magazine founded by Alaíde Foppa in 1976.

On the occasion of International Women's Year (1975), Barbieri produced a document requested by United Nations Economic Commission for Latin America and the Caribbean (ECLAC) on the social participation of women in Latin America. Together with the document prepared by Barbieri, four or five other documents were published by the Fondo de Cultura Económica under the title Mujeres en América Latina. Aportes para una discusión (1975).

After being a research assistant in the Social Development Division of ECLAC, she began working with Raúl Benítez Zenteno at UNAM's Institute of Social Research in the areas of sociology of population and demography. She was a professor at UNAM for more than 33 years. In addition to ECLAC, she was a consultant for other international organizations such as ILO and UNICEF.

=== Research on the gender category ===
Barbieri's research includes theoretical and methodological questions on gender, in which she analyzed and systematized knowledge on social differentiation based on the social constructions that organize and determine human beings as sexed beings.

"... los sistemas de sexo y género son los conjuntos de prácticas, símbolos, representaciones, normas y valores sociales que las sociedades elaboran a partir de la diferencia sexual anátomo-fisiológica y que dan sentido a la satisfacción de los impulsos sexuales, a la reproducción de las especie humana y en general al relacionamiento entre las personas... son, por lo tanto, el objeto de estudio más amplio para comprender y explicar el par subordinación femenina-dominación masculine."
" ... the systems of sex and gender are the sets of practices, symbols, representations, norms and social values that societies elaborate on the basis of the anatomical-physiological sexual difference and that give meaning to the satisfaction of sexual impulses, to the reproduction of the human species and in general to the relationship between people... they are, therefore, the broadest object of study to understand and explain the pair female subordination-male domination."

— Teresita de Barbieri

Barbieri's commitment to study these systems of social action and the meaning of action in relation to sexuality and reproduction was of a category, she said, that leaves open the possibility of the existence of different forms of relationship between women and men, between the feminine and the masculine. She also pointed out that gender problems are present in all of society and that, therefore, it is the responsibility of men and women deputies to introduce gender problems in all issues and in all areas of the Chamber of Deputies. She recommended to the legislators "not to make the language of gender vindication a heavy language that, after using it so much, repeating it and always being with the same thing, becomes boring, tiresome and generates rejection". In her document entitled Relaciones de Género en el Trabajo Parlamentario, she stated it was necessary to use imagination, to consult a thesaurus, to try to lighten and change the language.

Barbieri's research covered a variety of areas, including peasant and working women, domestic work and daily life, population policies, reproductive and health rights, gender, spheres and spheres of action. Her most recent work focused on women's participation in the state sphere.

== Awards and honours ==
- 2006. Sor Juana Inés de la Cruz Recognition awarded by UNAM
- 2012. Honored by UNAM's Institute of Social Researchfor "sowing the foundations of gender studies in Mexico" in the framework of International Women's Day.
- Recognition by FLACSO in Chile as an "illustrious personage".

== Selected works ==
=== Books ===
- El acceso de las mujeres a las carreras y ocupaciones tecnológicas de nivel medio. Santiago, ELAS-Unesco. (1972)
- Las unidades agrícolas industriales para la mujer campesina en México Geneva, International Labor Organization (1983).
- Incorporación de la mujer a la economía urbana de América Latina. Universidad Nacional Autónoma de México. 1983. OCLC 48284732.
- Mujeres y vida cotidiana. Fondo de Cultura Económica. 1984. ISBN 9789681615987. OCLC 1024534029.
- Movimientos feministas. Universidad Nacional Autónoma de México, Coordinación de Humanidades. 1986. ISBN 9789688376508. OCLC 1246310743.
- Barbieri, Teresita de; Oliveira, Orlandina de (1987). La presencia de las mujeres en América Latina en una década de crisis. Centro de Investigación para la Acción Femenina. OCLC 1022576414.
- Barbieri, Teresita de; Oliveira, Orlandina de (1989). Mujeres en América Latina: análisis de una década en crisis. IEPALA Editorial. ISBN 9788485436767. OCLC 1024447233.
- Barbieri, Martha Teresita de; Oliveira, Orlandina de (1989). Reproducción de la fuerza de trabajo en América Latina: algunas hipótesis. Trillas. OCLC 48310291.
- Presencia política de las mujeres. Secretaría General, Facultad Latinoamericana de Ciencias Sociales. 1991. OCLC 1368882730.
- Las mujeres y la crisis en América Latina. Entre Mujeres. 1992. OCLC 30058807.
- Women and the Crisis in Latin America. Entre Mujeres. 1993. OCLC 1050069046.
- Género en el trabajo parlamentario: la legislatura mexicana a fines del siglo XX. Consejo Latinoamericano de Ciencias Sociales. 2003. ISBN 9789509231917. OCLC 1034902723.

=== Articles ===
- "La mujer obrera chilena: una aproximación a su studio". With Lucía Ribeiro, Cuadernos de la realidad nacional, 16, (1973), pp. 167-201.
- "El trabajo doméstico entre obreras y esposas de obreros". Mexico City, UNAM-Instituto de Investigaciones Sociales, Mimeo, (1980).
- "Políticas de población y la mujer: antecedentes para su estudio", Revista mexicana de sociología, vol. 45, (1983), no. 1, pp. 293-308.
- "Las mujeres, menos madres: control de la natalidad: ¿control de la mujer?", Nueva Sociedad, 75, (1985), pp. 105-113.
- "Sobre la categoría de género: una introducción teórico-metodológica", Debates en Sociología, 18, (1993), pp. 145-169.
- "Geschlechterverhältnis zwischen Modernisierung und Krise", with Marianne Braig, Mexiko heute. Frankfurt, Vervuert, (1996), pp. 388-408.
- "Los ámbitos de acción de las mujeres", Narda Henríquez (ed.). Encrucijadas del saber: los estudios de género en las ciencias sociales. Lima, Pontifical Catholic University of Peru, (1996), pp. 107-132.
- "Los ámbitos de acción de las mujeres", Marianne Braig, Ursula Ferdinand, Martha Zapata (eds.). Begegnungen und Einmischungen: Festschrift für Renate Rott zum 60. Geburstag. Stuttgart, Heinz, (1997), pp. 213-233.
- "Cambio sociodemográfico, políticas de población y derechos reproductivos en México", Adriana Ortiz-Ortega (comp.). Derechos reproductivos de las mujeres: un debate sobre justicia social en México. México, Edamex (1999), pp. 101-145.
- "Una mirada desde el género a las comisiones legislativas", Revista Cimacnoticias, 9, no. 29 (2003)
- "Más de tres décadas de los estudios de género en América Latina", Revista Mexicana de Sociología, 66. (October, 2004): pp. 197-214
- "Público, doméstico y privado en la Cámara de Diputados.", Imágenes de la familia en el cambio de siglo: universo familiar y procesos demográficos contemporáneos, coordinated by Marina Ariza & Orlandina de Oliveira. Mexico City: UNAM-Instituto de Investigaciones Sociales, 2004.

=== Chapters ===
- United Nations. Economic Commission for Latin America, ed. (1975). "La condición de la mujer en América Latina: Su participación social; antecedentes y situación actual, by M. Teresita de Barbieri". Mujeres en América Latina: aportes para una discusión. Fondo de Cultura Económica. pp. 46–131. OCLC 1024589106.
- Wainerman, Catalina Haydée; Feijoó, María del Carmen; Jelin, Elizabeth (1983). "Prologue, Teresita de Barbieri". Del Deber Ser y el Hacer de Las Mujeres: Dos Estudios de Caso en Argentina. El Colegio de México/PISPAL. pp. 9–14. ISBN 978-0-598-12689-4. OCLC 253765686.
