= Elena Urrutia =

Mexican journalist and activist (1932-2015)

- Born: María Elena Lazo de Mendizábal; January 9, 1932; Mexico City, Mexico
- Died: October 30, 2015 (aged 83); Mexico City, Mexico
- Education: Free University of Brussels (1959 Bachelor of Language and Literature)
- Spouse: Óscar Urrutia
- Children: 4

María Elena Urritia (née Lazo de Mendizábal; January 9, 1932 – October 30, 2015) was a Mexican journalist, writer, researcher, and activist. She played a key role in starting the feminist magazine Fem. She was the fourth of six children born to conservative Catholic parents.

== Early life and education ==
María Elena Lazo de Mendizábal was born on January 9, 1932, in Mexico City, Mexico. Her father was a civil engineer while her mother was a housewife.

Urrutia studied psychology at the Ibero-American University from 1950 to 1954. She also attended seminars and classes at the National Autonomous University of Mexico without letting her parents know. To become financially independent and continue her studies, Urrutia obtained a job at a kindergarten and would later work for a cinematographic teleproduction company.

== Career ==
In the 1970s, Ramón Xirau invited Urrutia to collaborate on his program, The Books of the Day (Los Libros del Día), which was transmitted from Radio Universidad, where Urrutia spoke about books written by women or on feminist topics. Later, Urrutia began writing about women in the paper The Sun (El Sol). She was also among the founders of the tabloid newspaper Unomásuno (One Plus One), where she wrote about women and covered topics such as interviews and critiques. She also played a role in the creation of Mexico City's daily newspaper, La Jornada (The Working Day), where she wrote about general cultural topics.

Urrutia temporarily worked in a cultural center belonging to UNAM, House of the Lake (Casa del Lago), where she organized the first cycle of conferences focused on topics important to women. Urrutia created her first compilation, The Image and Truth of Women (Imagen y Realidad de la Mujer), and published it in 1975 by utilizing the World Conference on Women, 1975 (Conferencia Mundial Sobre la Mujer de 1975), which was hosted in Mexico City. She would go on to meet Alaíde Foppa, who helped her to publish the first feminist magazine, Fem, in 1976 alongside Elena Poniatowska, Marta Lamas, and Lourdes Arizpe. While the push for women's rights was well underway at the time, Fem became the first printed forum to advocate for women's rights. In 1980, after Foppa's enforced disappearance, Urrutia took over as host of the radio program Foro de la Mujer. With the support of the Ford Foundation, she also co-founded The Interdisciplinary Program of Female Studies (PIEM) on March 15, 1983, alongside Arizpe and Flora Botton, an employee of Colmex, both of whom she met through Fem. Urrutia focused on women and covered topics such as gendercide, abortion, women and power. She also helped establish the Center for Psychological Studies in Colmex, led the Casa del Lago, and the Chopo University Museum.

Her dedication to human rights and women was evident through her literary workshops, which focused on Mexican feminism.

== Death ==
Urrutia died of cardiac arrest on October 30, 2015, in her home in Mexico City.

== Publications ==
- Arreola, J. J., Fernández, R. M., & Foppa, A. (1975). Imagen y Realidad de la Mujer (Image and Reality of Women).
- González Aralia López, Malagamba, A., & Urrutia, E. (1990). Mujer y Literatura Mexicana y Chicana: Culturas en Contacto. Volumen 2 (Mexican and Chicana Women and Literature: Cultures in Contact. Volume 2). Colegio de Mexico.
- Herrera, S. P., & Urrutia, E. (1997). Y Diversa de Mí Misma Entre Vuestras Plumas Ando. Homenaje Internacional a Sor Juana Inés de la Cruz (And Different From Myself Among Your Feathers I walk. International Tribute to Sor Juana Inés de la Cruz). Colegio de México.
- López-González Aralia, & Urrutia, E. (1988). Mujer y Literatura Mexicana y Chicana: Culturas en Contacto (Mexican and Chicana Women and Literature: Cultures in Contact). El Colegio de México.
- Pitol, S., & Antúnez Rafael. (2015). Tiempo Cerrado, Tiempo Abierto. Sergio Pitol Ante la Crítica (Time Closed, Time Open. Sergio Pitol Before Criticism). Instituto Literario de Veracruz.
- Urrutia, E. (1992). Mujer y Sida (Women and AIDS). El Colegio de México.
- Urrutia, E. (1995). Las Mujeres y la Salud (Women and Health). Las Mujeres y La Salud, 9–10.
- Urrutia, E. (2002). Elena Urrutia, Estudios Sobre las Mujeres y las Relaciones de Género en México: Aportes Desde Diversas Disciplinas (Elena Urrutia, Studies on Women and Gender Relations in Mexico: Contributions from Various Disciplines). El Colegio de México.
- Urrutia, E. (January 2005). Carolina Amor de Fournier, Tipógrafa del Siglo XX (Carolina Love of Fournier, Typographer of the Century XX). Lima, Año VI No. 62, enero del 2005.
- Urrutia, E (2006). Nueve Escritoras Mexicanas Nacidas en la Primera Mitad del Siglo XX y Una Revista (Nine Female Mexican Authors Born in the First Haf of the Century XX and a Magazine).
