= Anilú Elías =

- Born: Esperanza Brito Moreno; 1937 (age 88–89); Mexico City, Mexico
- Occupations: journalist, feminist, reproductive rights activist
- Years active: 1972–present

Anilú Elías (born 1937) is a journalist, publicist, theoretical scholar, professor and feminist activist from Mexico City, who has been on the front lines of the fight for reproductive rights of Mexican women. Her written works focus on gender studies from a feminist perspective and evaluate the impact of patriarchy on women and its ties with sexual violence. She is a professor at the College of Mexico and a publicist at Dirección Creativa (Creative Directions), managing advertising in both the United States and Mexico.

In 1972, she co-founded the National Women's Movement, to advocate for a woman's right to make her own reproductive choices. Throughout the 1970s she and others led marches in support of abortion as a choice. In 1976, she along with Esperanza Brito de Martí and Carmela Barajas, organized the First National Conference on Abortion to advocate for free abortions for all women. President Luis Echeverría, pressed by the activists, called together the Interdisciplinary Group for the Study of Abortion, which included a range of professionals, religious leaders and scientists to study the issue. A report of their findings was prepared, which supported decriminalization of voluntary abortion and inclusion of abortion services in the government health program. Congress neither passed nor implemented the recommendations. The report also highlighted the need for sexual education as early as primary school; information about contraception from high school forward; access to contraception; rejection of forced sterilization; and the rejection of abortion as a population control system. Activists strongly supported implementation of all of the findings.

In the early to mid-1990s Elías and other feminists, including Manú Dornbierer, Esperanza Brito de Martí, Marta Lamas, worked for the passage of domestic violence laws and marital rape criminalization. In November, 1996, the Criminal Code for Mexico City was modified to define domestic violence and marital rape as a crime, allow violence as grounds for divorce and declare that all family members had a right to live free from violence. This was a victory for its supporters, though it did not effectively alter state criminal codes.

== Selected works ==
- Elías, Anilú; Moreno, Hortensia; David, Henry Philip (1991). Hijos no deseados (in Spanish). Mexico: EDAMEX. ISBN 978-9-684-09614-1.
- Elías, Anilú; Dosal, Herminia (1997). 150 años de costumbres, modas y Liverpool (in Spanish). Mexico: El Puerto de Liverpool. ISBN 978-9-686-28599-4.
- Elías, Anilú (2011). La rebelión de las mansas (in Spanish). Mexico: O. A. Colmenares y Vargas. ISBN 978-6-079-13913-1.
