= Sara Sefchovich =

Mexican writer, sociologist, and historian (born 1949)

- Born: Sara Sefchovich Wasongarz; April 2, 1949 (age 77); Mexico City, Mexico
- Occupation: Writer
- Spouse: Carlos Martínez Assad
- Children: 1+

Academic background
- Education: National Autonomous University of Mexico (BA, MS, PhD)
- Thesis: Historia, ideas y novelas: las esposas de los gobernantes de México (2005)

Academic work
- Discipline: Sociology, history
- Sub-discipline: Mexican history, social issues
- Institutions: Institute for Social Research, UNAM
- Notable works: Demasiado amor (1990)
- Website: www.sarasefchovich.com

Sara Sefchovich (born Sara Sefchovich Wasongarz; April 2, 1949 in Mexico City) is a Mexican writer, researcher, sociologist, and historian. She has been a researcher at National Autonomous University of Mexico's Institute for Social Research since 1973 and specializes in Mexican history.

== Biography ==
Sefchovich was born and raised in Mexico City, primarily in Condesa's Jewish community. She is of Polish-Jewish and Lithuanian-Jewish descent. Her father Guillermo "Memo" was a scholar; he and Sechovich's mother Aida were both avid readers. Her parents gave her the Diary of Anne Frank when she was 8 or 9 years old; this heavily inspired Sefchovich. She began keeping a diary, addressing each entry to "Kitty" like Frank did in her diary. Around the same time, she won a story contest at school, which strengthened her interest in becoming a writer.

She studied sociology at the National Autonomous University of Mexico (UNAM), finishing her bachelor's degree in 1977 with the thesis La sociología de la literatura de Lukacs. She earned a master's degree in sociology 1987, also from UNAM and with the thesis Una sociología de la novela mexicana. In 2005, she earned her doctorate degree in History of Mexico from UNAM. Her dissertation was titled Historia, ideas y novelas: las esposas de los gobernantes de México. She joined UNAM's Institute of Social Research in 1973 and has been a researcher there for more than 50 years. She has also done research at the Consejo Nacional de Humanidades, Ciencias y Tecnologías (CONAHCYT) since 1985. She was a visiting professor at Arizona State University in the United States around 2005.

In 1988, Sevchovich's essay Mexico: pais de ideas, pais de novelas (1987), which was about 19th- and 20th-century Mexican literature, was adapted to stage with a script by Carmen Boullosa and direction by Alejandro Aura. In the 1980s, she was involved in the second-wave feminism movement, but was dismissed by some as upholding gender norms by becoming a mother. In 1992, she so-founded the Information on Elective Reproduction Group (GIRE; Grupo de Información en Reproducción Elegida) with Marta Lamas, Patricia Mercado, María Consuelo Mejía, and Lucero González. The group sought to provide information on abortion options to legislature and the press, and helped decriminalize it in 2007. GIRE also worked on protections for victims of sexual violence and access to safe abortions, and promoted abortion as a human rights issue.

Her first novel Demasiado amor was published in 1990 and earned her the Agustín Yáñez Award. The story follows a sex worker named Beatriz as she explores her identity and sexual relationships, written in the form of letters to a lover and to her sister. The book was adapted to film in 2002 and starred Ari Telch. Subsequent books included La señora de los sueños (1993) and La suerte de la consorte (1999). In 1995, she participated in the homage to Luis Spota at the Palacio de Bellas Artes with other writers such as Jaime Labastida, Elda Peralta, Pedro Angel Palou, Bernardo Ruiz and Lisandro Otero.

In Son Mejores las Mujeres? (2011) she argued against the notion that women are inherently better than men and criticized feminists who completely dismiss the issues faced by men. She wrote that the "supposed intrinsic goodness" comes from conservative ideas of motherhood, humility, and obedience. In preparation for ¡Atrévete! Propuesta hereje contra la violencia en México (2014), Sefchovich traveled around Mexico to meet with families of criminals. She came to the conclusion that mothers, from their cultural role as heart of the family, had the ability to reduce or even end drug trafficking if they themselves dissuaded their sons from crime. However, she found that, while they loved their sons deeply, they were unwilling to sacrifice the benefits they gained from their sons being thieves and drug dealers, "even at the cost" of their children being imprisoned or killed. She believed this was due in part to violence being normalized in society. At the Guadalajara International Book Fair in 2020, Sefchovich debuted Demasiado odio, the sequel to Demasiado amor. Her 2021 book Del silencio al estruendo: cambios en la escritura de las mujeres a través del tiempo provides an overview of literature written by Mexican women throughout history.

Sefchovich has been a weekly columnist for El Universal for more than 20 years. She has also written for Fem, Revista Mexicana de Sociología, Cuadernos de Comunicación, Los Universitarios, Revista de la Universidad de México, Casa del Tiempo, La Semana de Bellas Artes, La Cultura en México, Sábado, La Jornada, Reforma, Monitor, Noroeste, Radio Red, Radio Monitor, and Diario Judío. As of 2020, her writing has been translated into six languages. In addition to her own writing, she has served on the editorial boards of Fem (1976-1985), Debate Feminista (1990-present), and Eslabones (1997–present). She was appointed to the Federal District's Promotion and Development Committee as Representative Councillor of the Artistic and Cultural Community in March 2004, and to the Cultural Development Committee as Head of Council in February 2007. Additionally, she was on the internal council of UNAM's Institute of Social Research (1976-1985) and was elected titular councillor of that board with a term of March 2007 to 2009. She is included in the book Invenciones multitudinarias: Escritoras judiomexicanas contemporaneas (2000) by Guadalupe Cortina.

== Personal life ==
Sefchovich is married to researcher Carlos Martínez Assad, for whom she compiled the book Mil y un caminos, una sola vocación (2023) in recognition of his career. She has a son, Rodrigo, a composer of electroacoustic music, with her first husband, Isaac Sigal.

== Awards ==
- 1989: Plural de Ensayo Award
- 1989: Gabino Barreda Medal for academic excellence, UNAM
- 1989: Guggenheim Fellowship
- 1990: Agustín Yáñez Award for Demasiado amor
- 1993: Leona Gerard Endowed Lectureship from University of California, Irvine
- 2011: Manuel Levinsky Award
- 2011: Omecíhuatl Medal by the Women's Institute of Mexico City
- 2018: Clementina Díaz y de Ovando Award for work in social, cultural and gender history, UNAM

== Selected publications ==
=== Books ===
- Demasiado amor. Editorial Planeta. 1990. ISBN 968-406-308-3.
- La señora de los sueños. Editorial Planeta. 1993. ISBN 968-406-163-3.
- La suerte de la consorte. Océano. 1999. ISBN 970-651-214-4.
- Vivir la vida. Aguilar. 2000. ISBN 968-19-0803-1.
- País de mentiras. Océano. 2009. ISBN 978-607-400-043-6.
- ¿Son mejores las mujeres?. Paidos. 2011. ISBN 978-607-762-694-7.
- Vida y milagros de la crónica en México. Océano. 2017. ISBN 978-607-527-382-2.
- Demasiado odio. Huso Editorial. 2020. ISBN 978-841-256-082-4.
- Del silencio al estruendo: cambios en la escritura de las mujeres a través del tiempo. Formento Editorial. 2021. ISBN 978-607-304-191-1.

=== Essays ===
- La teoría de la literatura de Luckacs. UNAM. 1978. ISBN 968-58-2634-X.
- Ideología y ficción en la obra de Luis Spota. Grijalbo. 1985. ISBN 978-968-419-514-1.
- México: país de ideas, país de novelas: una sociología de la literatura mexicana. Grijalbo. 1987. ISBN 978-968-419-667-4.
- Veinte preguntas ciudadanas a la mitad más visible de la pareja presidencial con todo y sus respuestas (también ciudadanas). Océano. 2004. ISBN 978-970-651-886-6.
- ¡Atrévete! Propuesta hereje contra la violencia en México. Aguilar. 2014. ISBN 978-607-113-483-7.
- El cielo completo, mujeres escribiendo. Océano. 2015. ISBN 978-607-735-742-1.
- La marca indeleble de la cultura. UNAM. 2016. ISBN 978-607-02-8410-6.

=== Translations ===
- Zillah Eisenstein, ed. (1980) [1979]. El patriarcado capitalista y la situación del feminismo socialista.
