= Flora Botton =

Greek-born Mexican sinologist and gender studies scholar (born 1933)

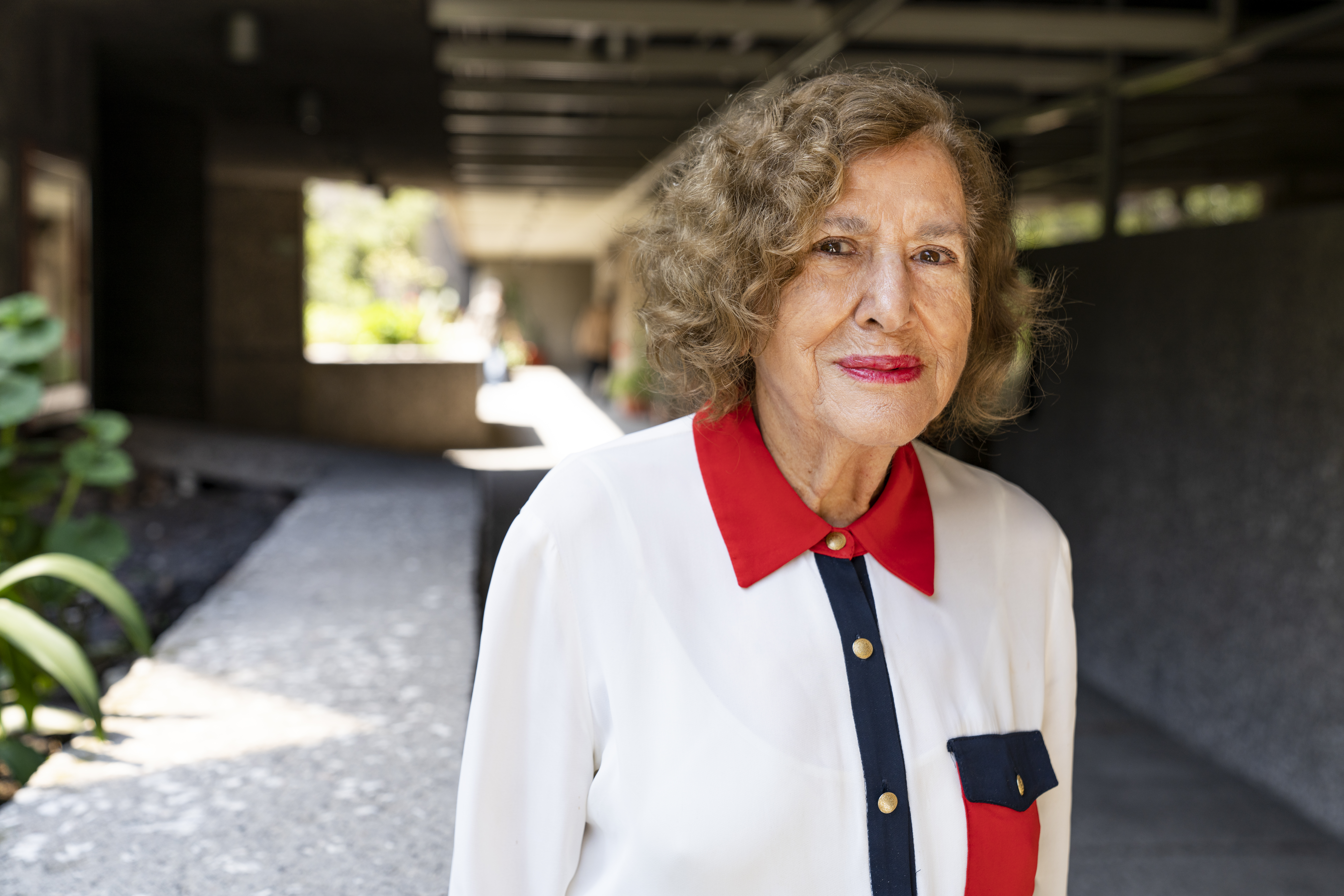
- Botton in 2022
- Born: 1 March 1933 (age 93); Thessaloniki, Greece
- Other name: Flora Botton Beja
- Occupation: academic
- Years active: 1956–
- Relatives: Flora Botton Burlá, cousin

Flora Botton Beja (born 1 March 1933) is a Mexican sinologist and gender studies scholar. She was born in Greece, but acquired Spanish nationality through her parents and naturalized as Mexican after her arrival in Mexico in 1949. She was a co-founder of the gender studies and a pioneer of Oriental studies programs at El Colegio de México. She was one of the first academics to focus on China in Mexico and Latin America. Her works have widely been influential in the region and she was one of the founders of the Asociación Latinoamericana de Estudios de Asia y África (Latin-American Association of Asian and African Studies).

== Early life and education ==
Flora Botton was born on 1 March 1933 in Thessaloniki, Greece, to Spanish nationals, Sara Beja and Jaime Botton (Botón) Saporta, who dealt in the textile industry. Her family were part of the Sephardic Jewish diaspora. When she was seven, Thessaloniki became an occupied territory, first by Italy and then in 1941 by the Nazis. Assisted by friends, the family fled to Athens which was still under the control of Benito Mussolini's forces. In early 1944, the Nazis took over the occupation and in April, Flora's brother, parents, grandmother, aunts, uncles, and cousins were arrested in the middle of the night and transported to the Bergen-Belsen concentration camp. With the Allied Forces closing in, plans were made to transport prisoners to Austria. One week before the British liberation of the camp, three train loads carrying prisoners left the camp on 6, 7, and 9 April 1945. Close to five thousand evacuees in Botton's group were abandoned at Magdeburg where they were discovered by a Ninth United States Army soldier on patrol on 13 April. The Ninth Army had arrived in Magdeburg two days prior during the assault on the Ruhr pocket.

Cared for by the United Nations Relief and Rehabilitation Administration, the Botton family was evacuated in the summer of 1945 to Brussels, Belgium. After three months in a refugee camp, they were sent to Marseille, France, and continued on to Bari, Italy, finally arriving back in Athens in October. Jaime re-established his store, and Botton continued her education at the American School until 1949. That year at the end of the school term, the family moved to Mexico City, motivated by post-war tensions in Greece. Her paternal grandmother, Flor Saporta, after whom she was named, migrated with them. Botton completed her high schooling at the Colegios Garside, one of the first bilingual academies in Mexico. In 1950, she enrolled at Mexico City College, earning a Bachelor of Arts in philosophy, cum laude, in 1952 and continuing her studies there, completing a master's degree (also cum laude) in 1953. Furthering her education, Botton moved to Paris and studied European history and Spanish literature for a year at the Sorbonne.

== Career ==
In 1955, Botton returned to Mexico City and began her career teaching in a private finishing school. She was hired to teach philosophy at her alma mater in 1956. In 1964, she was accepted into the first 2-year master's degree program in Oriental studies at El Colegio de México (Colmex). Between 1966 and 1968, Botton studied at the School of Oriental and African Studies at the University of London and then spent several months studying at the National Taiwan Normal University in Taipei. In 1969, she joined the Center for Asian and African Studies at Colmex. This was the first department in Latin America to focus on Chinese studies. Funded by UNESCO the program was initially taught by visiting scholars from around the world with the plan to replace the teaching staff with Mexicans once they were trained. Botton became the first Mexican sinologist to join the center. Between 1972 and 1974 she worked on her doctorate, studying modern and classical Chinese language, history, and culture at the University of Michigan.

Botton was one of the founding editors of Fem in 1976 and remained on the editorial board until 1990. That same year, she became one of the founders of the Asociación Latinoamericana de Estudios de Asia y África (Latin-American Association of Asian and African Studies). Between 1978 and 1980 she served as a cultural attaché at the Mexican Embassy in Beijing, China. She returned to Mexico in 1981 and served as the director of the journal Estudios de Asia y África until 1987. Involved in the feminist movement, Botton founded, along with Lourdes Arizpe and Elena Urrutia, the Programa Interdisciplinario de Estudios de la Mujer (PIEM, Interdisciplinary Women's Studies Program) at Colmex in 1983, which at the time was not favorably considered by many academics in Mexico or Latin America. (Note: In 2018, the name of the program was changed to the Programa Interdisciplinario de Estudios de Género (PIEG, Interdisciplinary Gender Studies Program) and in 2021 was renamed as the Centro de Estudios de Género (CEG, Gender Studies Center).) In 1991, she became the director of the Center for Asian and African Studies at Colmex, serving until 1997. In addition to teaching at Colmex, Botton, a naturalized Mexican, has been a visiting professor at the Autonomous University of Madrid, Harvard University, the Hebrew University of Jerusalem, Institute of Southeast Asian Studies in Singapore, and Renmin University of China in Beijing, among many others.

== Awards and recognition ==
Botton is a member of the Sistema Nacional de Investigadores (National System of Researchers). In 2012, a group of her students published China: estudios y ensayos en honor de Flora Botton Beja (China, Studies and Essays in Honor of Flora Botton Beja) in recognition of her influence over Sinology in Latin America. She was honored in Chile in 2016 for her work in founding the Asociación Latinoamericana de Estudios de Asia y África (Latin-American Association of Asian and African Studies). The 5th International Congress on Chinese Studies, hosted in March 2020, was held in her honor, recognizing her pioneering role in the field. In 2021, Arizpe, Botton, and Urrutia (posthumously) were recognized for their founding of the gender studies program at Colmex.

== Selected works ==
Botton has extensively published varied works on China. Her preliminary works dealt with Chinese philosophy, but she moved into studies of history and then contemporary cultural and social issues.

=== Books ===
- Botton Beja, Flora (1984). China: su historia y cultura hasta 1800 [China: Its History and Culture up to 1800] (in Spanish) (1a ed.). Mexico City: El Colegio de México. ISBN 978-968-12-0282-8. (Second edition published in 2000.)
- Maeth, Russell; Botton Beja, Flora; Page, John (1984). Dinastía Han, (202 a.c.-220 d.c.) [The Han Dynasty (202 BC-220 AD)]. Serie Fuentes para el estudio de China (in Spanish). Vol. 2 (Primeraición ed.). Mexico City: El Colegio de México, Centro de Estudios de Asia y Africa. ISBN 978-968-12-0241-5.
- Wang, Meng (1985). Botton Beja, Flora (ed.). Cuentos [Stories] (in Spanish). Translated by Ruochuan, Duan (1a ed.). Mexico City: El Colegio de México, Centro de Estudios de Asia y África. ISBN 978-968-12-0316-0.
- Botton Beja, Flora; Cornejo Bustamante, Romer (1993). Bajo un mismo techo: la familia tradicional en China y su crisis [Under One Roof: The Traditional Family in China and Its Crises] (in Spanish) (1a ed.). Mexico City: El Colegio de Mexico. doi:10.2307/j.ctv3dnrft. ISBN 978-968-12-0549-2.
- Botton Beja, Flora, ed. (2010). Historia mínima de China [Short History of China] (in Spanish) (Primeraición ed.). Mexico City: El Colegio de México. ISBN 978-607-462-066-5. (Second edition published in 2018.)
- Botton Beja, Flora (2019). Ensayos sobre China: una antología [Essays on China: An Anthology] (in Spanish) (Primeraición ed.). Ciudad de México, México: El Colegio de México. ISBN 978-607-628-577-0.
- Botton Beja, Flora; Cervera, José Antonio; Chen, Yong (2021). Historia mínima del confucianismo [Short History of Confucianism] (in Spanish) (Primeraición ed.). Mexico City: El Colegio de México. ISBN 978-607-564-174-4.
