= Foro de la Mujer =

Mexican radio program (1972–1986)

- Country of origin: Mexico
- Home station: Radio UNAM
- Created by: Alaíde Foppa
- Narrated by: Alaíde Foppa (1972–1980); Elena Urrutia (1980–1986)
- Original release: 1972 – 1986

Foro de la Mujer (transl. 'Women's Forum') was a radio program broadcast on Radio UNAM, the radio station of the National Autonomous University of Mexico. Created in 1972 by Guatemalan academic Alaíde Foppa, it discussed global women's and human rights issues, often reporting on political violence and repression. After Foppa's disappearance in 1980, it was hosted by Mexican journalist Elena Urrutia until 1986. It has been preserved as part of UNESCO's Memory of the World Programme since 2008, and digitized recordings of it were used for a biographical radio series covering Foppa's life.

== History and programming ==
Foro de la Mujer (transl. 'Women's Forum') was created in 1972 by Guatemalan academic Alaíde Foppa. It was broadcast on Radio UNAM, the radio station of the National Autonomous University of Mexico. It aired on Sundays at 7:00 a.m. from 1972 to 1976, after which its time slot was moved to Saturdays at 9:15 a.m. Prior to Foro de la Mujer's creation, most radio programs hosted by women in Mexico pertained to literature and the arts. Foro de la Mujer hosted artists and writers, but also women from other professions, including activists, anthropologists, economists, psychologists, and sociologists.

Topics covered by Foro de la Mujer were wide-ranging, with discussions of women's activities in countries throughout the world. The program commonly dispensed advice on domestic matters and recipes, using these conceits to address topics such as gender-related violence, parental alienation, reproductive rights, and women's role in society. Foro de la Mujer covered human rights-related issues as well. Torture was commonly discussed, as were global human rights abuses, including an incident in which two pregnant dissidents in Francoist Spain were sentenced to death and the enforced disappearance of Guatemalan journalist Irma Flaquer.

The program also covered the First World Conference on Women, which took place in Mexico City in 1975, focusing on the conflict with American feminist Betty Friedan, who argued for unity between middle-class and working-class feminists, and Latin American feminists such as Domitila Chúngara, many of whom argued that equality for middle-class women was insufficient for working-class women, who had to confront not just gender-based discrimination, but also issues like hunger and labor exploitation. Foppa argued that:

When feminists in developed countries talk about development, they think about increasing the number of women entrepreneurs and business managers, having more female members of parliament and secretaries of state, more women graduating from universities and receiving better pay for their services, and that this would mean getting closer to equality between men and women. But that wouldn't change the inequality between social classes!

After Foppa's own disappearance in 1980, Mexican journalist Elena Urrutia became the host. Under Urrutia's tenure, Foro de la Mujer covered the history of feminism in Mexico, including the Protest Against the Myth of the Mother, during which activists used the Monument to the Mother in Mexico City to challenge the social construction of motherhood. The program ceased production in 1986. Its final broadcast included an interview with three Kʼicheʼ survivors of the Guatemalan genocide, one of them future Nobel Peace Prize laureate Rigoberta Menchú.

== Legacy ==
Since 2008, Foro de la Mujer has been preserved as part of UNESCO's Memory of the World Programme. Recordings from Foro de la Mujer—57 in total—were digitized in 2014 and subsequently used as part of a radio series called Un encuentro con Alaíde Foppa: Voz y palabra (transl. 'An Encounter with Alaíde Foppa: Voice and Word'), which also included biographical information about Foppa.

== Sources ==
- Abreu Vargas, Rita del Carmen (2024). Damas sin antifaz: Mujeres en la radio [Ladies without masks: Women on the radio] (in Spanish). Mexico City: Editorial Universidad de Guadalajara. ISBN 978-607-581-339-4.
- Cocco, Elisa (2023). "Alaíde Foppa: una vita da dissidente" [Alaíde Foppa: a dissident's life] (PDF). Cuadernos del Hipogrifo (in Italian). 20: 11–25. ISSN 2420-918X.
- López, Guisela (2015). "Alaíde Foppa aportes para una educación inclusiva. Avances de una investigación en marcha" [Alaíde Foppa contributions for an inclusive education. Developments of an ongoing investigation]. Ciencias Sociales y Humanidades. 2 (2): 33–40. doi:10.36829/63CHS.v2i2.130. ISSN 2410-6291.
- McCutcheon, Erin L. (2022). "Monumental Interventions: Feminism, Art and Public Resistance in Mexico". AWARE.
- Partnoy, Alicia (2003). "On Being Shorter: How Our Testimonial Texts Defy the Academy". In Browdy de Hernandez, Jennifer (ed.). Women Writing Resistance: Essays on Latin America and the Caribbean. Cambridge: South End Press. ISBN 978-0-89608-708-8.
- Pleitez Vela, Tania (2024). "Foro de la Mujer: costuras y fisuras del pensamiento feminista". In Gil, Mónica Albizúrez (ed.). Urgente futuro. Escritos sobre Alaíde Foppa (in Spanish). Guatemala: Universidad Rafael Landívar. ISBN 9929-54-559-X.
