= Margarita García Flores =

Margarita García Flores (4 July 1922 in Monterrey, Nuevo León – 10 September 2009 in Mexico City) was a Mexican lawyer, activist, writer and politician; she was also involved in women's suffrage. García cofounded Fem magazine with Alaíde Foppa in 1976; it was the first Latin American feminist magazine. She served as director of Universitarios and Prensa, as well as the publications of National Autonomous University of Mexico. García was also a delegate from Cuajimalpa (1976–80), deputy for III Distrito Electoral Federal de Nuevo León (1973–76), and a deputy for Distrito IV de Nuevo León (1955–58).

== Selected works ==
- Estudio sobre la situación social, económica y jurídica de la mujer que trabaja en México, 1945
- La seguridad social y el bienestar humano, 1965
- La igualdad jurídica, 1975
- La política en México vista por seis mujeres, coauthored, 1982
- Fray Servando y el federalismo mexicano, 1982
- La igualdad jurídica, 1985
- La seguridad social y la población marginada en México, 1989

== Bibliography ==
- Hernandez, Jennifer Browdy de (2003). Women Writing Resistance: Essays on Latin America and the Caribbean. South End Press. p. 173. ISBN 978-0-89608-708-8.
- Marín, María Luisa González; López, Patricia Rodríguez (1 January 2008). Límites y desigualdades en el empoderamiento de las mujeres en el PAN, PRI y PRD (in Spanish). UNAM. ISBN 978-970-819-114-2.
- Pinto, Magdalena García (6 September 2013). Women Writers of Latin America: Intimate Histories. University of Texas Press. ISBN 978-0-292-75592-5.
