= Lourdes Arizpe =

Mexican anthropologist (1943-)

Lourdes Arizpe Schlosser
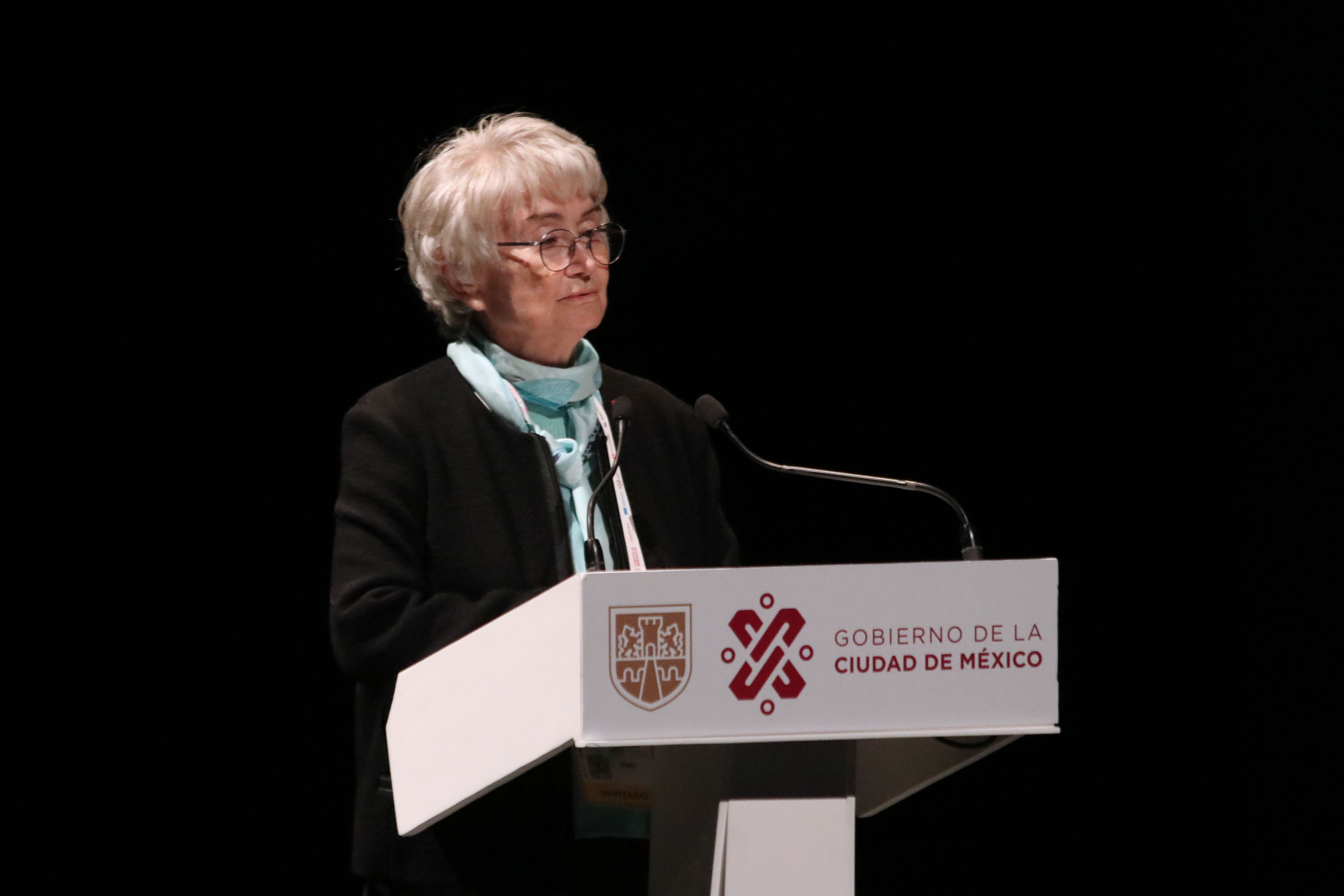
- Born: October 4, 1945 (age 80); Mexico City
- Education: University of Geneva
- Occupations: Professor of humanities and anthropology
- Employer: National Autonomous University of Mexico
- Honours: Guggenheim Fellowship

María de Lourdes Arizpe Schlosser (b. 1945), habitually cited as Lourdes Arizpe, is a Mexican professor in anthropology. In 1964, she obtained a Certificate in French Studies from the University of Geneva; in 1965, she studied history at the National Autonomous University of Mexico (UNAM). She obtained a degree in ethnology in 1985 from the National School of Anthropology and History (ENAH) in Mexico City. She obtained a doctorate in social anthropology from the London School of Economics and Political Science in the same year. In 2010, she received an honorary doctorate from the University of Florida in Gainesville.

Arizpe is Chair of Anthropology at the National Autonomous University of Mexico and has been director of the Museo Nacional de Culturas Populares and secretary of the Mexican Academy of Sciences. Between 1994 and 1998, she was Adjunct Director of UNESCO in Culture, president of the World Congress on the Status of the Artist, and president of the Intergovernmental Conference on Cultural Policies for Development, which took place in Stockholm, Sweden, in 1998. Lourdes was also a member and secretary general of the Rio Conference, president of the International Social Science Council, and a member of the Scientific Advisory Council of the International Science Council. She presided over the Board of Directors of the United Nations Research Institute for Social Development in Geneva.

Arizpe has published in various anthropological fields, including indigenous cultures, migration studies, women's studies, cultural sustainability and social sustainability, and intangible cultural heritage.

== Honors ==
=== Distinctions ===
- Fulbright-Hayes Fellowship, 1978
- John D. Guggenheim Fellowship, 1981
- Recognition for distinguished cultural services by the government of Pakistan,1997
- Order of Academic Palms, 2008
- Medal of academic merit from Universidad Veracruzana, Mexico
- Order of veneration from the government of Morelos, Mexico
- Recognition by El Colegio de México as a pioneer, together with Flora Botton and Elena Urrutia, in the field of gender studies

=== Memberships ===
- Royal Anthropological Institute of Great Britain and Ireland

== Selected publications ==
=== Books ===
- Kinship and economy in a Nahua Society. 1972
- Indians in the city: the case of the Marias. 1975
- Migration, ethnicity and economic change. 1978
- Peasants and migration. 1986
- Lourdes Arizpe S. 1989. La mujer en el desarrollo de México y de América Latina. Ed. UNAM. 271 pp. ISBN 9683608582 Available online
- Culture and development: an ethnographic study of a Mexican community. 1990
- Women and development in Mexico and Latin America. 1990
- Culture and Global Change: Social Perceptions of Deforestation in the Lacandona Rain Forest (1993). Edited, in Spanish: Contemporary anthropology in Mexico. 1993
- Anthropology in Latin America. 1993
- Carlos Serrano, Lourdes Arizpe S. 1993. Balance de la antropología en América Latina y el Caribe. Ed. UNAM. 589 pp. ISBN 9683629997 Available online
- 2001. Estudios latinoamericanos sobre cultura y transformaciones sociales en tiempos de globalización. 2. Colección Grupos de trabajo de CLACSO. Ed. Clacso - Libronauta. 267 pp.
- Guiomar Alonso 2002. Cultura, comercio y globalización. Available online ISBN 9586710823
- 2004. Los retos culturales de México. Conocer para decidir/ Knows to Decide. Ed. UNAM Centro Regional de Investigaciones Multidisciplinarios. 388 pp. ISBN 9707015020
- 2004. Reabrir espacios públicos: políticas culturales y ciudadanía. Antropología (Plaza y Valdés (Firm). Compilador: Néstor García Canclini. Ed. Plaza y Valdés. 397 pp. ISBN 9707222530 en línea
- 2004. Antología sobre cultura popular e indígena: lecturas del seminario Diálogos en la Acción, primera etapa. Volumen 1 de Antología sobre culturas populares e indígena. Ed. CONACULTA, Dirección General de Culturas Populares e Indígenas. 258 pp. ISBN 9703505732
