= Alaíde Foppa =

Guatemalan poet, feminist, and educator (1914–c. 1980)

- Portrait of Foppa
- Born: María Alaíde Foppa Falla; 3 December 1914; Barcelona, Spain
- Disappeared: 19 December 1980 (age 66); Guatemala City, Guatemala
- Status: Presumed murdered
- Other name: de Solórzano
- Occupations: Academic, poet, human rights defender, translator
- Children: 5, including Julio Solórzano Foppa
- Relatives: Juan Francisco Solórzano Foppa (grandson)

María Alaíde Foppa Falla (3 December 1914 – disappeared 19 December 1980) was a Guatemalan academic, feminist, poet, human rights defender, and translator who fled to Mexico after the 1954 Guatemalan coup d'état and eventually was disappeared during a return visit to Guatemala in 1980. Born in Barcelona, Spain, in 1914, Foppa came from a wealthy liberal family. She moved to Italy around 1930, where she began writing poetry in Italian and later studied literature and art history at the Sapienza University of Rome. She then moved to Guatemala in 1943, where she was deeply moved by the social injustice she perceived under the regime of Jorge Ubico. She became a Guatemalan citizen in 1944 and developed connections with the revolutionary movement that forced Ubico's resignation that year.

Foppa married labor activist Alfonso Solórzano, who fled to Mexico after the 1954 coup. She eventually joined him in Mexico City in 1957, where she participated in academic and artistic circles. While in Mexico, she co-founded the magazine Fem and hosted Foro de la Mujer (transl. 'Women's Forum'), a radio program discussing women's issues in Mexico. In addition, she established an Italian literature department at the National Autonomous University of Mexico (UNAM), where she also taught the first course on women's sociology in a Latin American university. In December 1980, Foppa traveled to Guatemala and was abducted by members of the G-2 intelligence unit. Her disappearance prompted immediate action from her family, her friends, colleagues, artists, academics, and human rights advocates. Despite ongoing efforts, official investigations and legal proceedings have yielded no definitive results in her case.

Foppa published several poetry collections throughout her life. These collections explore themes of motherhood, female agency, and departure through aestheticist and feminist frameworks. She also published several notable translations, including a Spanish translation of the poetry of Michelangelo and a French translation of the book El libro vacio (transl. 'The empty book') by Josefina Vicens. A poetry prize was established in her honor in 1998, as was a dedicated international academic chair in 2011. She has been the subject of both a radio program, Un encuentro con Alaíde Foppa: Voz y palabra (2014, transl. 'An encounter with Alaíde Foppa: voice and word'), and a documentary, Alaíde Foppa: La sin ventura (2014, transl. 'Alaíde Foppa: The unfortunate'). Her life and legacy have been discussed by journalists and scholars such as Elena Poniatowska, Karina Leyte Chávez, and Nathalie Ludec, who highlight her significance as a feminist icon and a symbol for human rights struggles.

== Early life ==
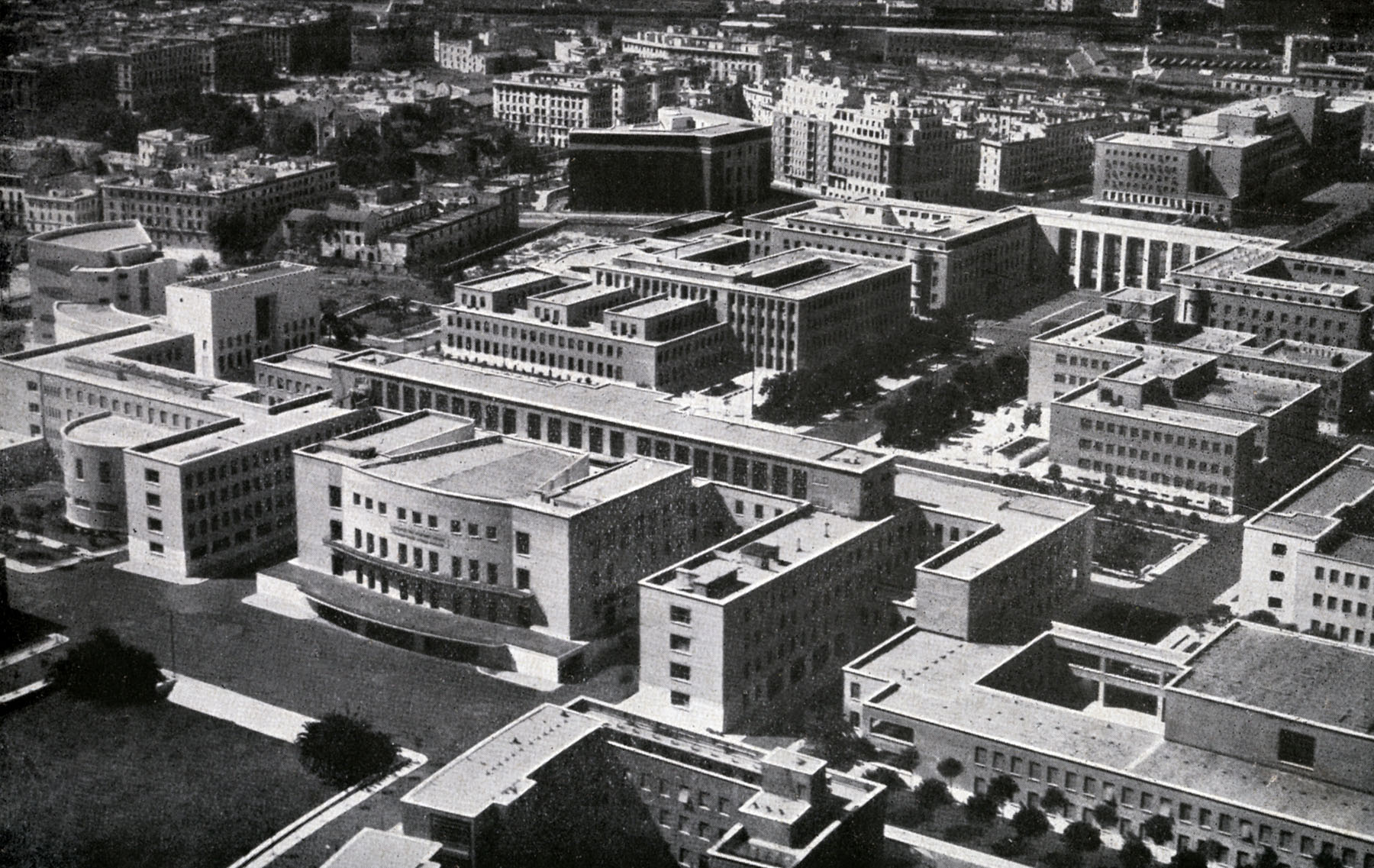
The Sapienza University of Rome, where Foppa studied literature and art history

María Alaíde Foppa Falla was born on 3 December 1914 to Julia Falla Aris and Tito Livio Foppa in Barcelona, Spain. Her mother was a Guatemalan pianist, and her father was an Italian-Argentine diplomat, journalist, and playwright. Her family was wealthy and politically liberal. Her youth was characterized by her exposure to art and theater, and she traveled extensively, including to Argentina, Belgium, France, and Switzerland. She was fluent in English, French, and Italian. Because of her father's diplomatic duties, her family moved to Italy around 1930. It was in Italy that she wrote her first poems, which were in Italian. In 1933, she began attending the Sapienza University of Rome, where she studied literature and art history. Foppa's studies occurred during a period of struggle between fascists and anti-fascists, a conflict that began when fascist Benito Mussolini was appointed prime minister of Italy in 1922. While Foppa held anti-fascist sympathies, her non-native status prevented her from publicly declaring these views.

== Guatemalan Revolution ==
Foppa moved to Guatemala in 1943 to be closer to her mother, who had separated from her father and moved there some time earlier. At the time, Jorge Ubico was president. Ubico's presidency was characterized by increased militarization, unpaid corvée labor, and persecution of labor and communist activists. Foppa was deeply impacted by what she saw as the "social injustice" prevalent under the Ubico regime and felt personally compelled to address it. Beginning in 1943, Ubico's presidency faced opposition from students, the middle class, and the elite, which culminated in his resignation on 30 June 1944 and the appointment of a military junta led by Juan Federico Ponce Vaides.

Conflict between the junta and the revolutionary opposition forces, led by Juan José Arévalo, escalated and turned violent in October 1944, with Foppa volunteering at a hospital to provide care for those injured in the conflict. Foppa also formally became a Guatemalan citizen in 1944. On 20 October, Ponce resigned, and Arévalo won the 1944 Guatemalan presidential election in December, assuming the presidency in March 1945. That year, Foppa published her first book of poetry, Poesías (transl. 'Poems'). Over time, she formed relationships with members of the revolutionary movement—including a brief romantic relationship with Arévalo, with whom she had a son, Julio—and embraced their ideals. She participated in the campaign launched by Arévalo in 1946 to address the country's low literacy rate of 30%, joined the humanities faculty at the University of San Carlos of Guatemala (USAC), and founded an organization called Pro-Arte.

== Marriage and exile ==
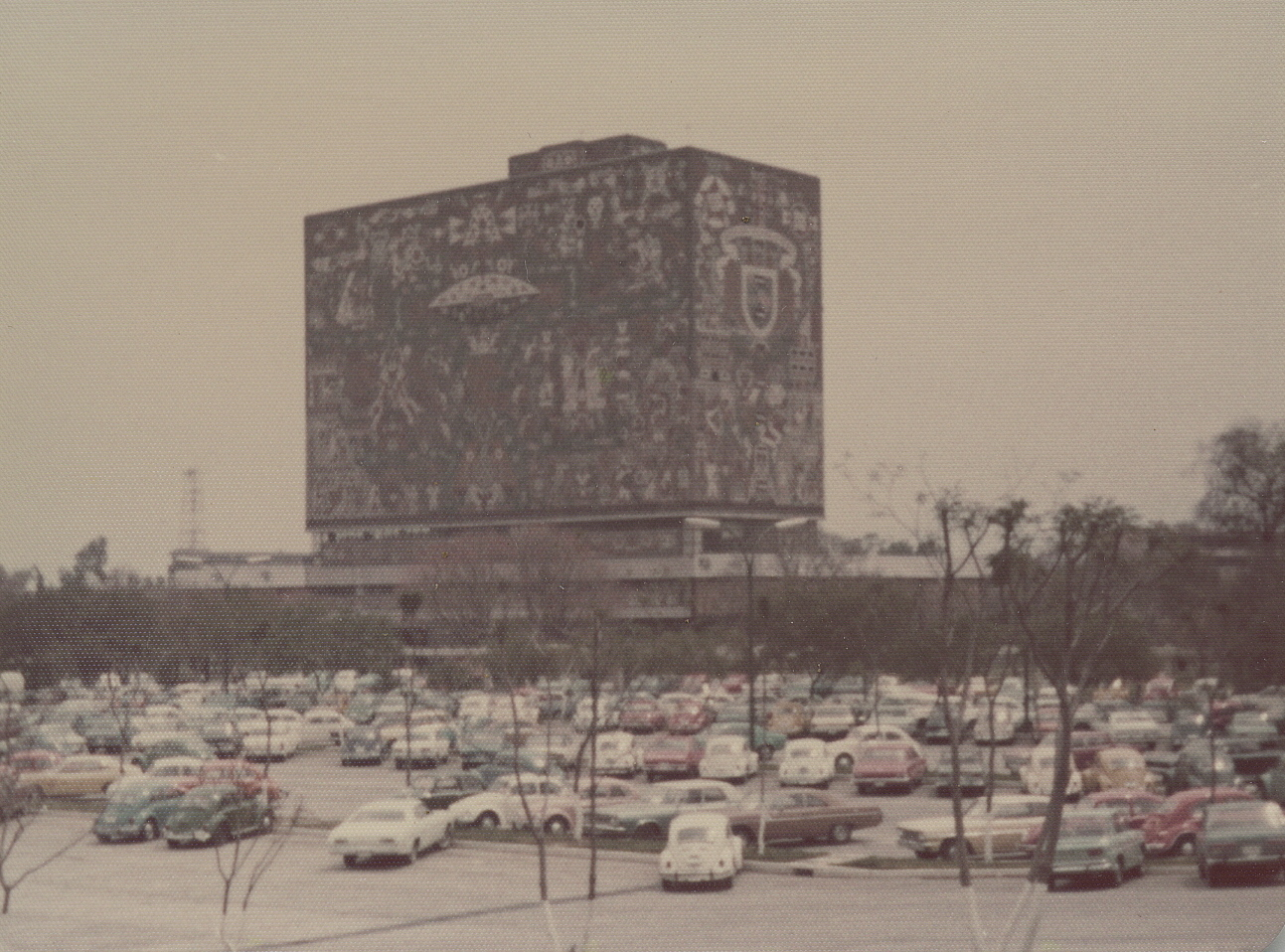
The Central Library of the National Autonomous University of Mexico (UNAM), where Foppa taught Italian, as well as a course in women's sociology

At some point, Foppa married Alfonso Solórzano. Solórzano was one of the founders of the Guatemalan Party of Labour, working for the revolutionary government as an administrator and diplomat. The couple had four children: Mario, Laura, Silvia, and Juan Pablo. During this time, Foppa wrote poetry and contributed her writing the newspaper El Imparcial. Solórzano and thousands of others were forced to flee Guatemala in 1954 after a coup d'état backed by the Central Intelligence Agency (CIA) of the United States overthrew the democratically-elected government of Jacobo Árbenz and provided the new regime, led by Carlos Castillo Armas, with a list of suspected communists to be extrajudicially killed or imprisoned. While Solórzano fled to Mexico, Foppa and the children initially stayed in Guatemala, where she founded the Institute of Italian Culture and published her second book of poetry, La sin ventura (transl. 'The unfortunate'), in 1955. However, the repression of the counterrevolutionary government eventually became unbearable for her, and in 1957, she moved to Mexico with the children.

Foppa and her family lived in Mexico City, where they received support from family and friends. Foppa integrated into local academic and artistic communities, connecting with other prominent Guatemalan refugees such as Augusto Monterroso, Carlos Illescas, Luis Cardoza y Aragón, Luz Méndez de la Vega, Mario Monteforte Toledo, Miguel Ángel Asturias, and Otto-Raúl González. She often hosted meetings for refugees at her home, where they discussed cultural and political issues. She also published her third book of poetry, Los dedos de mi mano (transl. 'The fingers of my hand'), in 1958. In 1961, she founded the department of Italian literature at the National Autonomous University of Mexico (UNAM), where she taught Italian and offered a course in women's sociology, the first of its kind at a Latin American university. Her fourth book of poetry, Aunque es de noche (transl. 'Although it's night'), was published in 1962, followed by Guirnalda de primavera (transl. 'Spring wreath') in 1965 and Elogio de mi cuerpo (transl. 'Praise of my body') in 1970. She also participated in the "Conferences on Women", organized by academic Elena Urrutia in 1972, which aimed to foster discussion on women's participation in social life. Beginning in 1972, Foppa hosted the radio program Foro de la Mujer (transl. 'Women's Forum'). The program dispensed advice on domestic matters and recipes, using these conceits to address topics such as gender-related violence, parental alienation, reproductive rights, and women's role in society.

During this time, Foppa also worked for an organization called Tribuna y Acción para la Mujer (TYAM, transl. 'Tribune and Action for Women'). According to a graduate thesis published by Stephanie Salas Pérez, the group met at a feminist bookstore managed by Foppa and Margarita García Flores at the Juan José Arreola Lake House cultural center. Per Salas Pérez, Foppa and Flores may have initially developed the idea for a magazine called Fem at a TYAM meeting at the bookstore. However, academic Elisa Cocco claims that the idea came from a conversation between Foppa, García, and Elena Poniatowska during a trip to Morelia, Michoacán. Both authors agree that a group of women met at Foppa's house to discuss the creation of the magazine. Its first issue was published in late 1976. Foppa acted as the magazine's primary director and personally financed its publication. During its publication run, it served as a platform for analyzing and discussing women's role in Mexican society, as well as promoting a "new identity" for women in Mexico, according to Cocco.

Foppa became the Women's chair at UNAM in 1976. After learning that three of her children were involved in the Guerrilla Army of the Poor (EGP)—a rebel guerrilla force that developed in the Guatemalan Highlands as a result of the Civil War—she worked throughout the late 1970s to publicize the human rights violations and sociopolitical conflicts taking place in the country. She was one of the first people to publicly interview Kʼicheʼ human rights defender Rigoberta Menchú. She also condemned the bombing of Guatemalan villages by US aircraft, collaborated with Amnesty International (Note: According to Leyte Chávez, she served as president of Amnesty International in some capacity.) and Luis Cardoza y Aragón's Guatemalan Committee for Patriotic Unity, and joined the International Association of Women Against Repression. Her final book of poetry, Las palabras y el tiempo (transl. 'Words and time'), was published in 1979.

== Disappearance ==
In December 1980, Foppa traveled to Guatemala, having recently lost her son, Juan Pablo, (Note: According to Ludec, Juan Pablo was working as a teacher in the Guatemalan Highlands when he was murdered by the Guatemalan Army and "thrown into a mass grave". However, according to Leyte Chávez, he died "in combat".) and her husband, who died in a traffic collision. Various reasons have been given for Foppa's trip, including that she was visiting her mother and that she went to bury her husband's remains. According to journalist Alma Guillermoprieto, she was actually on a courier mission for an unspecified Guatemalan guerrilla group, having decided to "match [Juan Pablo's] sacrifice". Allegedly, on 19 December 1980, Foppa had gone to buy flowers and pick up her passport on her way to the airport in Guatemala City. She was accompanied by her mother's driver, Leocadio Axtún, who took her to the Plaza El Amate, where they were intercepted by members of the G-2 intelligence unit. The day after her abduction, the newspaper Prensa Libre reported that several armed men beat Foppa and forced her back into her car, which then left the scene. The car and its occupants were never seen again. Her husband's brother later claimed that she was tortured and killed the day she was captured. However, Guillermoprieto claims that Foppa's relatives told her that she was tortured for months before she died.

=== Initial reactions ===
The news of Foppa's disappearance spurred her family to take immediate action. Her daughter, Laura, who was already in New York City on a dance scholarship, leveraged her trip to visit the Headquarters of the United Nations (UN) and the human rights office of the Organization of American States (OAS). Meanwhile, Julio flew to Paris and, with the help of friends, secured an audience with the French Legislative Assembly, seeking their intervention in the case. After returning to Mexico, Julio met with Jorge Castañeda y Álvarez de la Rosa, the Mexican Secretary of Foreign Affairs. As a result of this meeting, Mexican President José López Portillo authorized a commission, which included legal scholars, journalists, and members of Foppa's family, to investigate her disappearance. However, a veiled threat arrived just before their departure, warning that "international communism, in its efforts to make the Guatemalan government look bad, may cause harm... to them". Believing the risk was too high and that Foppa was likely no longer alive, the commission ultimately decided against traveling to Guatemala.

In early 1981, the Guatemalan government claimed that Foppa was kidnapped by leftist groups due to her mother's wealth and privilege and because of her brother-in-law's connections to the Ministry of Economy. However, they later accused Foppa of being a "subversive guerrilla agent". In Mexico, the newspaper Unomásuno regularly printed stories denouncing Foppa's disappearance, and a demonstration was held at the Guatemalan embassy in Mexico City. In December 1981, a group of activists, academics, and writers including Allen Ginsberg, Aryeh Neier, Dore Ashton, Grace Paley, Nat Hentoff, Sol Yurick, Susan Lukas, and Susan Sontag formed the Committee for the Life of Alaíde Foppa to demand her "safety, her immediate return, and a full government accounting of her disappearance". This group eventually merged with the Democratic Front Against Repression to support the Guatemalan people more broadly. In 1982, Foppa's daughter Silvia, a member of the EGP, sent a recording made in Guatemala's Quiché Department to the committee that stated that Foppa had died from torture.

=== Later developments ===
On 2 December 1999, a case regarding Foppa's disappearance was opened at the Spanish National Court. However, the Guatemalan authorities did not respond. In 2005, an explosion at a police station on the periphery of Guatemala City led to the discovery of the Guatemala National Police Archives. This archive contains police records spanning from 1880, the year of the National Police's formation. As forensic analysis of the documents began, Julio sought to guarantee their continued accessibility by contacting the University of Texas at Austin's Rapoport Center for Human Rights to digitize them in hopes that they might contain information pertinent to his mother's case.

In 2010, Foppa's family, along with the Mutual Support Group, the Center of Informative Reports on Guatemala (CERIGUA), and several other organizations, formally requested that Guatemalan authorities launch an inquiry into Foppa's disappearance. Later, in 2012, the Inter-American Commission on Human Rights (IACHR) filed a complaint against Guatemala concerning its inaction on the case. In 2014, Silvia confirmed that no resolution had been achieved through any of the legal proceedings, including those in Spain, before the Guatemalan Supreme Court, or stemming from the IACHR case. As of 2017, Julio claimed that the investigation into the Guatemala National Police Archives "[hadn't] found much information", but that they "had found some", urging the Guatemalan government to take responsibility for the investigation.

== Writing and translation ==
With the eyes of farewell,
I saw you that day,
things from our life.
With the eyes of farewell, life seemed
like something lost.
The house was empty
at the hour of farewell,
and yet there remained
things from our life.

— Excerpt from "Adiós" (transl. 'Goodbye') by Alaíde Foppa

Foppa published seven books of poetry over a period of 34 years, beginning with the publication of Poesías in 1945 and ending with the publication of Las palabras y el tiempo in 1979, one year before her death. Cocco describes Foppa's poetic voice as "intimate and lyrical", generally avoiding directly political themes except in her poem "Mujer" (transl. 'Women'), which Cocco describes as an "openly feminist text". Writers Diana del Ángel and Alejandro Palma attribute this to the influence of the aestheticist movement: an artistic and literary movement originating in the 19th century that advocated for art's independence from moral or religious functions, valuing it purely for its intrinsic aesthetic merit. However, Cocco argues that while Foppa's poetry is not openly political, the act of writing from a female viewpoint inherently connects it to feminist ideals. Academic Carmen Miranda Barrios similarly argues that Foppa's La sin ventura, an epic poem about Beatriz de la Cueva, belongs to a "feminist discourse", offering glimpses at the Latin American feminist movement through the lens of travel literature.

Motherhood is a recurring theme in many of Foppa's poems, such as "¿Quién eres tú?" (transl. 'Who are you?'), which is dedicated to her son Juan Pablo. Meanwhile, in the collection Elogio de mi cuerpo, she discusses and, per Cocco, "appropriates" her own body. Cocco interprets this, particularly her use of erotic language, as a clear rejection of the "ancient paradigm of female passivity". Later, in the collection Aunque es de noche, Foppa further reflects on womanhood, particularly in the poem "Ella se siente" (transl. 'She feels'). In the poem, Foppa uses the feminine personal pronoun ella to speak on behalf of all women, discussing the neglect and objectification experienced by women throughout time and space.

Academic Silvia Maria Gianni identifies departure as a common theme in Foppa's poetry, as exemplified by her poem "Adiós" (transl. 'Goodbye'). According to Elena Poniatowska, co-founder of Fem magazine, Foppa lived in 58 different houses throughout her life and understood the profound displacement associated with nomadic existence, expressing a desire to return to Guatemala. However, per Gianni, in Foppa's work, the longing for familiar places usually gives way to the emergence of new possibilities, reflecting Foppa's understanding that her identity is "constructed between uprootings". Gianni also discusses Foppa's work as a translator, particularly her Spanish translation of the poetry of Michelangelo and her French translation of the novel El libro vacio (transl. 'The empty book') by Josefina Vicens, noting that Foppa preferred to reinterpret the works that she translated in a poetic register.

== Legacy ==
Foppa's legacy has been commemorated in various ways. Throughout the 1980s, she was eulogized in print, including in Fem, which published an article about her in 1984, and in Doblejornada, which published an article about her in 1987. In 1998, the Guatemalan feminist organization Tertulia (Note: For an explanation of the name, see tertulia.) organized the Alaíde Foppa Poetry Prize. That same year, the National Campaign against Violence against Women, which took place in Mexico City, was dedicated to Foppa. In 2011, the Alaíde Foppa International Chair—the purpose of which is to promote Foppa's life, contribute to the development of gender studies, promote literary education for women, and inspire women's creative expression—was created in a collaboration between UNAM and USAC. Recordings from Foro de la Mujer—57 in total—were digitized in 2014 and subsequently used as part of a radio series called Un encuentro con Alaíde Foppa: Voz y palabra (transl. 'An encounter with Alaíde Foppa: voice and word'), which also included biographical information about Foppa. A documentary titled Alaíde Foppa: La sin ventura, directed by María del Carmen de Lara, was released in 2014.

Discussions about Foppa's life and legacy have also taken place among journalists and scholars. In a 2012 article, Poniatowska eulogizes Foppa as a "romantic heroine of Latin America in the 20th century" and an important figure in the history of Mexican feminism. Meanwhile, academic Karina Leyte Chávez argues that Foppa's "denunciation of injustice and the disadvantaged situation of women" while exiled in Mexico "ensured that her ideals of social transformation, embraced at least since the time of the 1944 revolution, were not forgotten". She further argues that Foppa's exile was consequential not just for her but for the nation of Guatemala, since she interacted regularly with other Guatemalan refugees in Mexico.

In 2006, sociologist Nathalie Ludec published an analysis of Foppa's impact on online discourse. According to Ludec, at the time of writing, Foppa was used as a "universal symbol" for the struggle for human rights and women's rights online. Per Ludec, Foppa was deployed as a "valorizing memory" by internet users, and her poems were displayed on multiple webpages, including one associated with the University of California system. In her analysis, Ludec found that most websites discussed aspects of Foppa's personality rather than her disappearance. However, she argues that Foppa's disappearance amplified discussions of other aspects of her life.

== Bibliography ==
- (1945) Poesías (transl. 'Poems')
- (1955) La sin ventura (transl. 'The unfortunate')
- (1960) Los dedos de mi mano (transl. 'The fingers of my hand')
- (1962) Aunque es de noche (transl. 'Although it's night')
- (1965) Guirnalda de primavera (transl. 'Spring wreath')
- (1970) Elogio de mi cuerpo (transl. 'Praise of my body')
- (1979) Las palabras y el tiempo (transl. 'Words and time')

== See also ==
- List of people who disappeared

== Sources ==
- Binder, Ellen; et al. (1981). "Missing Person". The New York Review of Books.
- Brett, Roddy (2009). "Rigoberta Menchú". In Forsythe, David P. (ed.). Encyclopedia of Human Rights. Oxford University Press. ISBN 978-0-19-533688-7.
- "CERIGUA demands inquiry into journalist's disappearance". IFEX. 23 November 2010.
- "CIDH conoce denuncia por desaparición forzada de Alaíde Foppa en 1980" [IACHR hears complaint of forced disappearance of Alaíde Foppa in 1980]. SinEmbargo MX (in Spanish). 2012.
- "City of the Disappeared – three decades of searching for Guatemala's missing". Amnesty International. 2012.
- Cocco, Elisa (2023). "Alaíde Foppa: una vita da dissidente" [Alaíde Foppa: a dissident's life] (PDF). Cuadernos del Hipogrifo (in Italian). 20: 11–25. ISSN 2420-918X.
- del Carmen Abreu Vargas, Rita (2024). Damas sin antifaz: Mujeres en la radio [Ladies without masks: Women on the radio] (in Spanish). Mexico City: Editorial Universidad de Guadalajara. ISBN 978-607-581-339-4.
- Díaz-Arias, David (2023). "Central America in the Age of Tyrants, c. 1930–1960". Oxford Research Encyclopedia of Latin American History. Oxford University Press. doi:10.1093/acrefore/9780199366439.013.1004. ISBN 978-0-19-936643-9.
- Elbein, Saul (2012). "The Long Road Home". The Texas Observer.
- Gianni, Silvia María (2021). "Alaíde Foppa y Alba de Céspedes: traductoras y mediadoras culturales en movimiento" [Alaíde Foppa and Alba de Céspedes: translators and cultural mediators on the move]. Lectora (in Spanish) (27): 107–125. doi:10.1344/Lectora2021.27.5. ISSN 1136-5781.
- Gleijeses, Piero (1991). Shattered Hope: The Guatemalan Revolution and the United States, 1944-1954. Princeton: Princeton University Press. ISBN 0-691-07817-3.
- Handy, Jim (1984). Gift of the Devil: A History of Guatemala. Boston: South End Press. ISBN 0-89608-248-2.
- Guillermoprieto, Alma (2001). Looking for History: Dispatches from Latin America. Pantheon. ISBN 0-375-42094-0.
- Leyte Chávez, Karina (2022). "Alaíde Foppa: exilio, poesía y feminismo" [Alaíde Foppa: exile, poetry and feminism]. In Santana, Adalberto (ed.). Intelectuales y políticos en el exilio iberoamericano [Intellectuals and politicians in Ibero-American exile] (in Spanish). Mexico City: Universidad Nacional Autónoma de México. pp. 127–136. ISBN 978-607-30-6024-0.
- López, Guisela (2015). "Alaíde Foppa aportes para una educación inclusiva. Avances de una investigación en marcha" [Alaíde Foppa contributions for an inclusive education. Developments of an ongoing investigation]. Ciencias Sociales y Humanidades. 2 (2): 33–40. doi:10.36829/63CHS.v2i2.130. ISSN 2410-6291.
- López García, Guadalupe (2014). "Hija de Alaíde Foppa trae a México reclamo de justicia" [Alaíde Foppa's daughter brings her demand for justice to Mexico]. rotativo.com.mx. Archived from the original on 20 July 2019.
- Ludec, Nathalie (2000). "Alaíde Foppa... una escritora guatemalteca desaparecida... Su nombre a través de la Red" [Alaíde Foppa... a missing Guatemalan writer... Her name on the Internet]. Debate Feminista (in Spanish). 22: 109–130. doi:10.22201/cieg.2594066xe.2000.22.577 (inactive 1 July 2025). ISSN 0188-9478. JSTOR 42624602.
- Ludec, Nathalie (2006). "La Boletina de Morelia: órgano informativo de la Red Nacional de Mujeres, 1982-1985" [The Morelia Bulletin: information body of the National Women's Network, 1982-1985]. Comunicación y Sociedad (in Spanish). 5: 89–113. ISSN 0188-252X.
- May, Rachel A.; Schneider, Alejandro; González Arana, Roberto (21 June 2018). Caribbean Revolutions: Cold War Armed Movements. Cambridge University Press. doi:10.1017/9781108344081.002. ISBN 978-1-108-34408-1.
- Miranda Barrios, Carmen (2015). "El viaje de Beatriz -La Sin Ventura-, en la mirada feminista de Alaíde Foppa" [Beatriz's Journey -La Sin Ventura- through the feminist lens of Alaíde Foppa]. Ciencias Sociales y Humanidades. 2 (2): 65–70. doi:10.36829/63chs.v2i2.133. ISSN 2409-3475.
- Pérez, Regina (2017). "Julio Solórzano Foppa: No se puede construir el futuro sobre la base del olvido" [Julio Solórzano Foppa: The future cannot be built on the basis of forgetting] (PDF). La Hora. pp. 6–7.
- Poniatowska, Elena (1990). "Alaíde Foppa". Debate Feminista (in Spanish). 2: 4–15. doi:10.22201/cieg.2594066xe.1990.2.1905 (inactive 1 July 2025). ISSN 0188-9478. JSTOR 42625295.
- Poniatowska, Elena (2012). "Alaíde Foppa: 31 años después" [Alaíde Foppa: 31 years later]. La Jornada (in Spanish).
- Poniatowska, Elena (26 December 2022). "Un recuerdo de Alaíde Foppa" [A memory of Alaíde Foppa]. La Jornada (in Spanish).
- Riches, Christopher; Palmowski, Jan, eds. (2021). "Fascist movement, Italy". A Dictionary of Contemporary World History. Oxford University Press.
- Salas Pérez, Stephanie (2019). El periodismo feminista en México: la revista fem. Del feminismo histórico al indígena, 1976-2001 [Feminist journalism in Mexico: fem magazine. From historical to indigenous feminism, 1976-2001] (PDF) (Master's thesis) (in Spanish). Querétaro: Universidad Autónoma de Querétaro.
- Streeter, Stephen M. (2022). "The CIA in Guatemala". Oxford Research Encyclopedia of Latin American History. Oxford University Press. doi:10.1093/acrefore/9780199366439.013.1015. ISBN 978-0-19-936643-9.
- Taube, Isabel L. (2011). "Aestheticism". The Grove Encyclopedia of American Art. Oxford University Press.
- Vargas, Vania (2014). "Alaíde Foppa: El corazón tiene el tamaño de un puño cerrado" [Alaíde Foppa: The heart is the size of a closed fist]. El Periódico. Archived from the original on 2 April 2015.
- Zamora Márquez, Anaiz (2014). "Abiertos tres juicios por desaparición de feminista Alaíde Foppa" [Three trials open for the disappearance of feminist Alaíde Foppa]. Cimacnoticias (in Spanish). Archived from the original on 20 July 2019.
