= Fem (magazine) =

Feminist magazine

Fem is a major feminist magazine and the first Latin American one. It was published in print between 1976 and 2005, and has been digital ever since.

== The foundation ==
The idea for the magazine was conceived in 1975 during a conference in Morelia, Michoacán, and it was established the following year by Alaíde Foppa and Margarita García Flores. Foppa funded the project herself. The feminist sociologist, Teresita de Barbieri, began contributing to Fem in 1979.

Fem was one of the longest continually active magazines focusing on feminist issues published in Latin America. In 2005, its director, Esperanza Brito de Martí, reported that the print version was being discontinued due to high costs and from then on, the magazine would only be published online.

The magazine focuses on social and political issues, art and cinema. It contains news, poetry and short stories. Topics range from domestic violence to health care, women in the student movement, AIDS, prostitution, and Chicanas. The headquarters of the magazine are in Mexico City. The aspiration of the magazine was to bring a broad feminist perspective to Latin America, in hopes of inspiring grassroots feminist movements and achieving a recognition of the feminist ideologies within political and cultural spheres.

Initially the feminist perspectives of Fem were viewed as the domain of an educated elite that struggled to gain acceptance amongst the population. Much early success was sustained, however, through ties to publications such as Unomásuno. During interviews conducted by Fem, few women who held positions in the public eye were willing to acknowledge or identify their perspectives as feminist (e.g. the first female governor of Mexico, Griselda Alvarez). This sentiment, echoed by various Fem employees, found voice even in co-founder Elena Poniatowska. Poniatowska chose not to identify as feminist, regardless of her works and efforts with working-class women which clearly embodied a feminist perspective.

Fem was instrumental in establishing that sexuality was not simply a personal characteristic but also a political narrative that marked the oppression experienced by women throughout the world. Fem sought to address this issue within the scope of Latin American society. By asserting that women's biological differences from men were not challenges to be addressed individually, Fem illuminated the importance and political nature of maternity, abortion, sexuality, contraception, lesbianism and rape in interviews with individuals such as Marta Lamas whom were significant in the social recognition of women's imperatives within the male dominant hierarchy within Latin America.

Despite progressing the conversation surrounding women's rights, Fem was intentionally tentative in how it approached women's agency particularly relative to LGBT social movements within the U.S. which sometimes removed men as imperatives to the lives of women. This provisional strategy was employed to avoid alienation from the slower political and cultural developments relative to gender within Latin America. Fem also published works on violence against women and sexual violence though these efforts were also approached more slowly and cautiously than other tenets of feminisms for fear of dangerous backlash against the staff of the paper and women aligned with the feminist community.

== Bibliography ==
- Güereña, Salvador; Pisano, Vivian M. (1 January 1998). Latino Periodicals: A Selection Guide. McFarland. p. 83. ISBN 978-0-7864-0540-4.
- Hernandez, Jennifer Browdy de (2003). Women Writing Resistance: Essays on Latin America and the Caribbean. South End Press. p. 173. ISBN 978-0-89608-708-8.
- Morgan, Robin (1984). Sisterhood is Global: The International Women's Movement Anthology. Feminist Press at CUNY. ISBN 978-1-55861-160-3.
