= Marta Lamas =

Mexican anthropologist

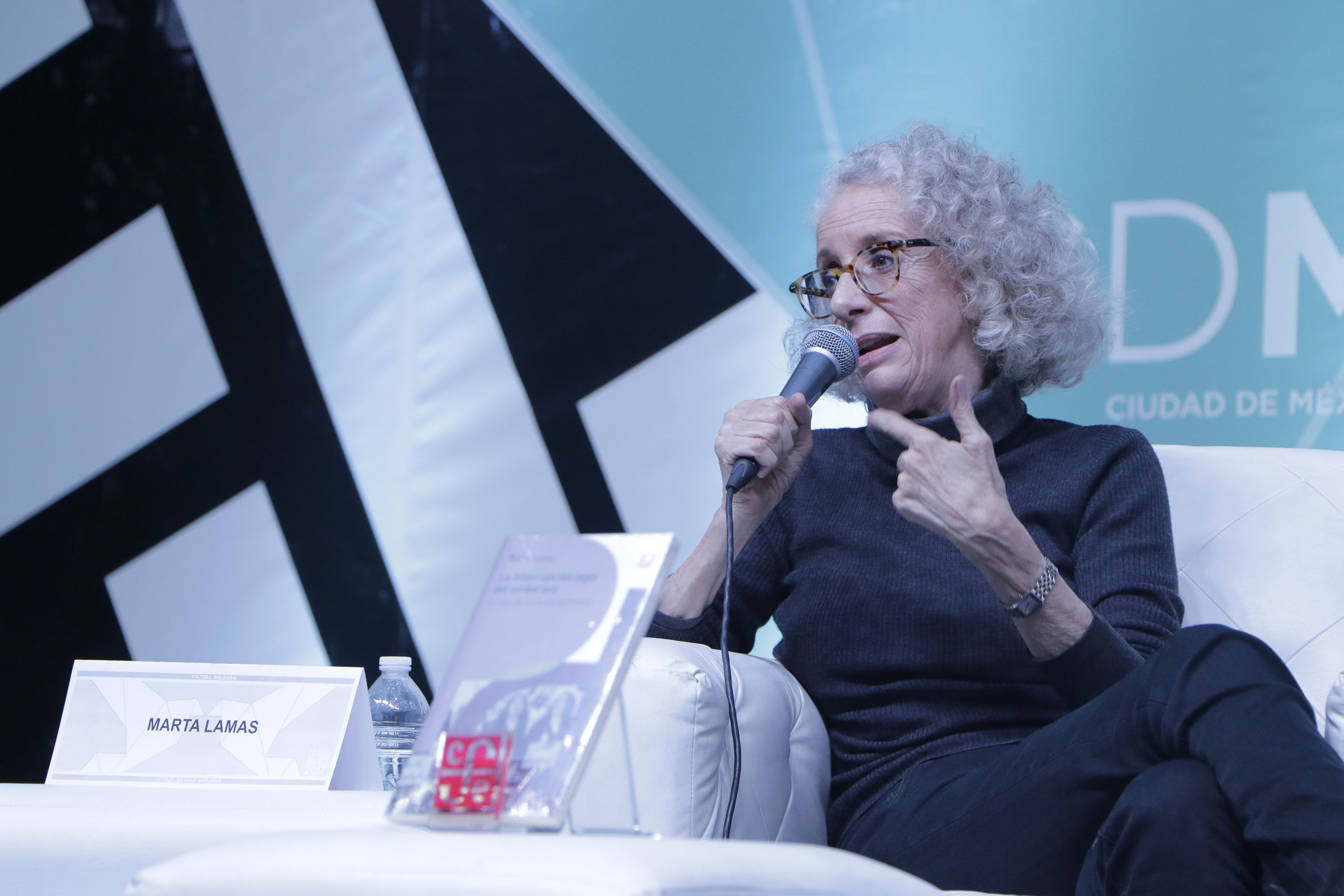
Marta Lamas speaking on the presentation of one of her books on Mexico City

Marta Lamas Encabo (born 1947) is a Mexican anthropologist and political science professor at the National Autonomous University of Mexico (UNAM), and lecturer at the Instituto Tecnológico Autónomo de México (ITAM). She is one of Mexico's leading feminists and has written many books aimed at reducing discrimination by opening public discourse on feminism, gender, prostitution and abortion. Since 1990, Lamas has edited one of Latin America's most important feminist journals, Debate Feminista (Feminist Debate). In 2005, she was nominated for a Nobel Peace Prize.

== Early life ==
Marta Lamas was born in 1947 in Mexico City to Argentine parents. She studied ethnology at the Escuela Nacional de Antropología e Historia (National School of Anthropology and History) and then completed a master's degree in anthropology at the National Autonomous University of Mexico.

== Journalistic endeavors ==
In 1976, she founded a feminist magazine, Fem, and in 1987, she co-founded the first feminist newspaper supplement in Mexico for the newspaper La Jornada: Doble Jornada (Double Day). In 1990, she founded Debate Feminista (Feminist Debate) a publication aimed at connecting academic feminist theory with the practices of activists in the women’s movement. The publication is a springboard for discussing ideas within the movement to evaluate how they can be brought to the public. Debate has become one of the most important journals in Latin America, because it also prints men's articles. She was a founding member of La Jornada and is a contributing columnist to the magazine Proceso and the Spanish newspaper El País and serves as an editorialist for the newspapers El Processo and Diario Monitor.

Lamas has written numerous books and is a prolific feminist writer.

== Activism ==
In 1990, she founded the Sociedad Mexicana Pro Derechos de la Mujer (Semillas), (The Mexican Society in Favor of the Rights of Women), which is an organization in which more privileged women can invest in women who have less opportunities. The group sponsors cooperatives and micro-enterprises and offers support centers and work groups which address problems women face, including human rights issues. The organization has expanded to have chapters in 24 of the 31 Mexican states.

In 1992 Lamas co-founded the Grupo de Información en Reproducción Elegida (GIRE) (Information Group on Reproductive Choice) to "disseminate information on abortion and reproductive and sexual health and rights from the bioethical, social and legal perspectives to lawmakers and the press". One of the objectives of the group was to change the discussion from whether one was for or against abortion and instead focus on who should decide. Lamas indicated this was a pivotal change in progress in the abortion debate in Mexico.

After 38 years of work by the feminist movement, driven by Ms. Lamas, in 2007 the Supreme Court of Justice of the Nation decriminalized in Mexico City abortions which occur by 12 weeks of gestation. GIRE lawyers assisted in drafting legislation and in coordinating defense of the law when lawsuits alleged it was unconstitutional. Marta Lamas testified during the Supreme Court trial.

== Educator ==
Lamas is a political science professor at the National Autonomous University of Mexico (UNAM) and lecturer at the Instituto Tecnológico Autónomo de México (Autonomous Technological Institute of Mexico) (ITAM)

In 2000 she founded the Instituto de Liderazgo Simone de Beauvoir (Simone de Beauvoir Leadership Institute), as a feminist organization of civil society with the goal of training social leaders. Its stated mission is one "of contributing to the construction of a democratic society of rights and freedoms, through knowledge, innovation and the training of leadership with social commitment and gender and intercultural perspective."

== Selected works ==
=== Books ===
- with Saal, Frida (co-author). La Bella (in)diferencia (The Beautiful (In)difference), 1991 (in Spanish).
- Para entender el concepto de género (Understanding the Concept of Gender), 1998 (In Spanish).
- Cidadania e feminismo (Citizenship and Feminism), 1999 (in Portuguese).
- Diversidad cultural y tolerancia (Cultural Diversity and Tolerance), 2000 (in Spanish).
- De la identidad a la ciudadanía (The Identity of Citizenship), 2000 (in Spanish).
- Ciudadanía y feminismo: compilación de ensayos aparecidos en "Debate feminista"(Citizenship and Feminism: compilation of essays that appeared in "Feminist Debate"), 2001 (in Spanish).
- Política y reproducción: aborto: la frontera del derecho a decidir (Policy and Reproduction: Abortion: The Border of the Right to Choose), 2001 (In Spanish).
- Cuerpo: diferencia sexual y género (Body: Sexual Difference and Gender), 2002 (In Spanish).
- El género la construcción cultural de la diferencia sexual (The cultural construction of the genre of sexual difference), 2003 (in Spanish).
- Feminismo: transmisiones y retransmisiones (Feminism: Transmissions and Retransmissions), 2006 (in Spanish).
- Nuevos horizontes de la interrupción legal del embarazo (New Horizons of the Legal Interruption of Pregnancy), 2005 (in Spanish).
- Feminismo (Feminism), 2007 (In Spanish).
- Miradas feministas sobre las mexicanas del siglo XX (Feminist Perspectives on Mexicans of the 20th Century), 2007 (In Spanish).
- Feminism: Transmissions and Retransmissions, 2011 (In English).
- Cuerpo, sexo y política (Body, Sex and Politics), 2014 (In Spanish).

=== Articles ===
- “Las dificultades de la diversidad.” Mujeres en Accion (Santiago de Chile) No. 15, (March 1989): pp 30–31 (in Spanish). Database: WorldCat
- Lamas, Marta (1990). "Editorial". Debate Feminista. 1: 1–5. JSTOR 42623879.
- Lamas, Marta (1990). "Lo que no se tiene". Debate Feminista. 1: 230–235. doi:10.22201/cieg.01889478p.1990.1.1884. JSTOR 42623906.
- Lamas, Marta (1990). "Editorial". Debate Feminista. 2: v–x. JSTOR 42625293.
- Lamas, Marta (1993). "El fulgor de la noche: algunos aspectos de la prostitución callejera en la ciudad de México". Debate Feminista. 8: 103–134. doi:10.22201/cieg.2594066xe.1993.8.1689. JSTOR 42624149.
- Lamas, Marta (1994). "Cuerpo: diferencia sexual y género". Debate Feminista. 10: 3–31. doi:10.22201/cieg.2594066xe.1994.10.1792. JSTOR 42624175.
- with Arias, Ma Antonieta Torres and Garcia, Lourdes Villafuerte (co-authors). ”Primera mesa redonda : algunos enfoques en el estudio de las dimensiones sociales de la sexualidad.” Reflexiones, Sexualidad, Salud y Reproduccion (Mexico) Vol. 01, No. 04, (April, 1995): p. 3-6 (in Spanish). Database: WorldCat
- Lamas, Marta (1996). "Trabajadoras sexuales: del estigma a la conciencia política". Estudios Sociológicos. 14 (40): 33–52. JSTOR 40420925.
- Lamas, Marta (1996). "Por un marcaje feminista o lo personal sigue siendo político después de veinticinco años". Debate Feminista. 13: 415–425. doi:10.22201/cieg.2594066xe.1996.13.319. JSTOR 42624349.
- Lamas, Marta (1997). "Nuevos valores sexuales". Debate Feminista. 16: 146–149. doi:10.22201/cieg.2594066xe.1997.16.409. JSTOR 42624443.
- Lamas, Marta (January 1997). "The feminist movement and the development of political discourse on voluntary motherhood in Mexico". Reproductive Health Matters. 5 (10): 58–67. doi:10.1016/S0968-8080(97)90086-0.
- Lamas, Marta (January 1998). "Scenes from a Mexican Battlefield". NACLA Report on the Americas. 31 (4): 17–43. doi:10.1080/10714839.1998.11722782.
- "Sexual Politics In Latin America". NACLA Report on the Americas. 31 (4): 16. January 1998. doi:10.1080/10714839.1998.11722781.
- Lamas, Marta (1998). "Un recuerdo de Marie Langer". Debate Feminista. 17: 327–330. doi:10.22201/cieg.2594066xe.1998.17.456. JSTOR 42624489.
- Lamas, Marta (1998). "Por un cambio imprescindible". Debate Feminista. 18: 419–421. JSTOR 42625388.
- ”El espacio del ejercicio ciudadano.” Perinatología y reproducción humana, Vol. 13, No. 1 (January–March 1999): pp 104–11 (in Spanish). Database: WorldCat
- "Usos, dificultades y posibilidades de la categoria genero." Papeles de Poblacion (Mexico): No. 01-55, Año 5, No. 21, (1999) Nueva Epoca: pp 147–178 (in Spanish). Database: WorldCat
- Lamas, Marta (1999). "Género, diferencias de sexo y diferencia sexual". Debate Feminista. 20: 84–106. doi:10.22201/cieg.2594066xe.1999.20.2044. JSTOR 42625720.
- Lamas, Marta; Bissell, Sharon (January 2000). "Abortion and politics in Mexico: 'context is all'". Reproductive Health Matters. 8 (16): 10–23. doi:10.1016/S0968-8080(00)90183-6. PMID 11424237. S2CID 39690038.
- with Ley, Angélica (co-author). “La lucha de los movimientos feministas por despenalizar el aborto en México.” Universidad Nacional Autónoma de México, Centro de Investigaciones Interdisciplinarias en Ciencias y Humanidades, VHS video (2001) (in Spanish). Database: WorldCat
- Lamas, Marta (March 2001). "Standing Fast In Mexico Protecting Women's Rights in a Hostile Climate An". NACLA Report on the Americas. 34 (5): 36–40. doi:10.1080/10714839.2001.11724595. S2CID 157394051.
- Lamas, Marta (2001). "De la autoexclusión al radicalismo participativo. Escenas de un proceso feminista". Debate Feminista. 23: 97–124. doi:10.22201/cieg.2594066xe.2001.23.601. JSTOR 42624628.
- Lamas, Marta (2002). "El feminismo de Virginia Woolf: el caso de Tres guineas". Debate Feminista. 25: 393–402. doi:10.22201/cieg.2594066xe.2002.25.649. JSTOR 42624708.
- "Genero y cultura." La Gaceta del Fondo de Cultura Económica. (México) No. 380, (August 2002): pp 38–39 (in Spanish). Database: WorldCat
- Liguori, Ana Luisa; Lamas, Marta (January 2003). "Gender, sexual citizenship and HIV/AIDS". Culture, Health & Sexuality. 5 (1): 87–90. doi:10.1080/713804641. S2CID 145239285.
- Lamas, Marta (2003). "Aborto, derecho y religión en el siglo XXI". Debate Feminista. 27: 139–164. doi:10.22201/cieg.2594066xe.2003.27.764. JSTOR 42624746.
- "La Real Academia y el "género".(la Real Academia Española de la Lengua recomenda suprimir el término género en contenido de ley contra violencia doméstica)." Proceso, (13 July 2005) (In Spanish). Database: amazon.com
- "Por un pluralismo sociocultural.(el fundamentalismo islámico en los Países Bajos)(Ayaan Hirsi Ali, diputada; asesinato del cineasta Theo Van Gogh)." Proceso, (13 July 2005) (In Spanish). Database: amazon.com
- "Compadecer a los políticos.(el papel de los políticos, de acuerdo a principios del autor Hans Magnus Enzensberger)." Proceso, (31 July 2005) (In Spanish). Database: amazon.com
- "El "hiyab": entre el fundamentalismo, la identidad y la laicidad.(controversia política y social por prohibírse a musulmanas portar vestido tradicional en escuelas públicas)." Proceso, (31 July 2005) (In Spanish). Database: amazon.com
- "Ver a través del escándalo.(proceso contra el empresario Carlos Ahumada)(escándalos dentro del Partido de la Revolución Democrática)." Proceso, (31 July 2005) (In Spanish). Database: amazon.com
- Lamas, Marta (2005). "Las bodas gays en España". Debate Feminista. 32: 114–131. doi:10.22201/cieg.2594066xe.2005.32.1225. JSTOR 42624895.
- "Las autoridades de Guanajuato violaron la ley al negar un aborto legal. (La Lucha).(se impide a enferma mental violada abortar)." Fem, (24 May 2006) (In Spanish). Database: amazon.com
- "Deseo de familia y homosexualidad.(celebración de Congreso Mundial de Familias)." Proceso, (27 June 2006) (In Spanish). Database: amazon.com
- "En el camino del bien morir.(Corte de Apelaciones de noveno circuito de Estados Unidos decide que el procurador general no puede enjuiciar a doctores ... estado de Oregon)." Proceso, (27 June 2006) (In Spanish). Database: amazon.com
- "Observatorio sobre la familia.(Seminario de Familias y Democracia)." Proceso, (27 June 2006) (In Spanish). Database: amazon.com
- "Procreación: ¿asunto público o privado?(legalización del aborto)." Proceso, (27 June 2006) (In Spanish). Database: amazon.com
- "La reunión de la CEPAL.(Conferencia Regional sobre la Mujer)." Proceso, (27 June 2006) (In Spanish). Database: amazon.com
- "El servicio civil de carrera." Proceso, (27 June 2006) (In Spanish). Database: amazon.com
- "Cuando uno no puede hablar, entonces debe escribir." Proceso, (28 June 2006) (In Spanish). Database: amazon.com
- "Génesis de la criminalidad.(La génesis del crimen en México, ensayo de Julio Guerrero; comentarios sobre el crimen en México)." Proceso, (28 June 2006) (In Spanish). Database: amazon.com
- Lamas, Marta (2007). "Bachelet: un año de gobierno". Debate Feminista. 35: 158–160. JSTOR 42624980.
- "El aborto en la agenda del desarrollo en América Latina" Perfiles Latinoamericanos (México) Vol. 16, No. 31, (January–June 2008): pp 65–94 (in Spanish). Database: WorldCat
- Lamas, Marta (June 2008). "El aborto en la agenda del desarrollo en América Latina" [The Abortion Issue in the Development Agenda of Latin American]. Perfiles Latinoamericanos (in Spanish). 16 (31): 65–93.
- Lamas, Marta (2009). "La despenalización del aborto en México". Nueva Sociedad. 220: 154–172, 218. ProQuest 199520659.
- Lamas, Marta (2009). "El fenómeno trans". Debate Feminista. 39: 3–13. doi:10.22201/cieg.2594066xe.2009.39.1414. JSTOR 42625541.
- Lamas, Marta (2009). "Los pasos, las poses y los pisos". Debate Feminista. 40: 13–22. doi:10.22201/cieg.2594066xe.2009.40.1436. JSTOR 42625112.
- Guerreiro, Sofia; Lamas, Marta; Candeias, Henrique; Eusébio, Rosário; Rocha, Vítor (January 2014). "The non-recurrent laryngeal nerve: An anatomical 'trap'". Revista Portuguesa de Endocrinologia, Diabetes e Metabolismo. 9 (1): 84–87. doi:10.1016/j.rpedm.2014.05.001.
- Lamas, Marta (January 2013). "Intrusas en la Universidad" [Intruders at the University]. Perfiles Educativos (in Spanish). 35 (141): 196–199.
- Lamas, Marta (February 2014). "Entre el estigma y la ley: La interrupción legal del embarazo en el DF" [Between the stigma and the law. Legal abortion in Mexico City]. Salud Pública de México (in Spanish). 56 (1): 56–62. doi:10.21149/spm.v56i1.7323.
- "Nestora Salgado: cautiverio injusto." Proceso, (30 April 2014) (In Spanish). Database: amazon.com
- "De sirvientas a empleadas." Proceso, (9 May 2014) (In Spanish). Database: amazon.com
- "Regulación del comercio sexual." Proceso, (13 May 2014) (In Spanish). Database: amazon.com
- "Las taquilleras del Metro." Proceso, (2 August 2014) (In Spanish). Database: amazon.com
- "¿Prostitución, trata o trabajo?" Nexos, (1 September 2014) (In Spanish). Database: nexos.com.mx
- "El legado de Elena.(Elena Poniatowska recibe el Premio Cervantes)." Proceso, (10 September 2014) (In Spanish). Database: amazon.com
- "Y en México, Á cuándo?(nueva política laboral sobre la regulación del salario para los trabajadores domésticos en Brasil)." Proceso, (20 September 2014) (In Spanish). Database: amazon.com
- "Nestora sigue presa.(represalias políticas contra Nestora Salgado, jefa de la Policía Comunitaria de Olinalá)." Proceso, (24 September 2014) (In Spanish). Database: amazon.com
- "Madres pobres y ricas.(el aborto en la política mexicana)." Proceso, (1 October 2014) (In Spanish). Database: amazon.com
- "Feminicidios y academia.(conferencia del Centro de Investigaciones Interdisciplinarias en Ciencias y Humanidades y el Programa Universitario de Estudios de Género de la UNAM)." Proceso, (7 November 2014) (In Spanish). Database: amazon.com
- "Hacia una reforma escandalosa.(protección del feto y el derecho a la vida en México)." Proceso, (12 November 2014) (In Spanish). Database: amazon.com
- "Dignidad del trabajo en el hogar.(derechos laborales de trabajadores domésticos)." Proceso, (14 November 2014) (In Spanish). Database: amazon.com
- "Cine de mujeres." Proceso, (25 November 2014) (In Spanish). Database: amazon.com
- "Furia y venganza por Ayotzinapa." Proceso, (25 November 2014) (In Spanish). Database: amazon.com
- "Mujeres y política neoliberal." Proceso, (11 December 2014) (In Spanish). Database: amazon.com
- "Paridad y conciliación.(A toda Madre! Una Mirada Multidisciplinaria a las Maternidades en México, seminario)(mujeres que postergan el embarazo para ... profesionalmente)." Proceso, (8 January 2015) (In Spanish). Database: amazon.com
- "Retóricas de la Intransigencia." Proceso, (27 January 2015) (In Spanish). Database: amazon.com
