= Tijuana =

Largest city in Baja California, Mexico

- City
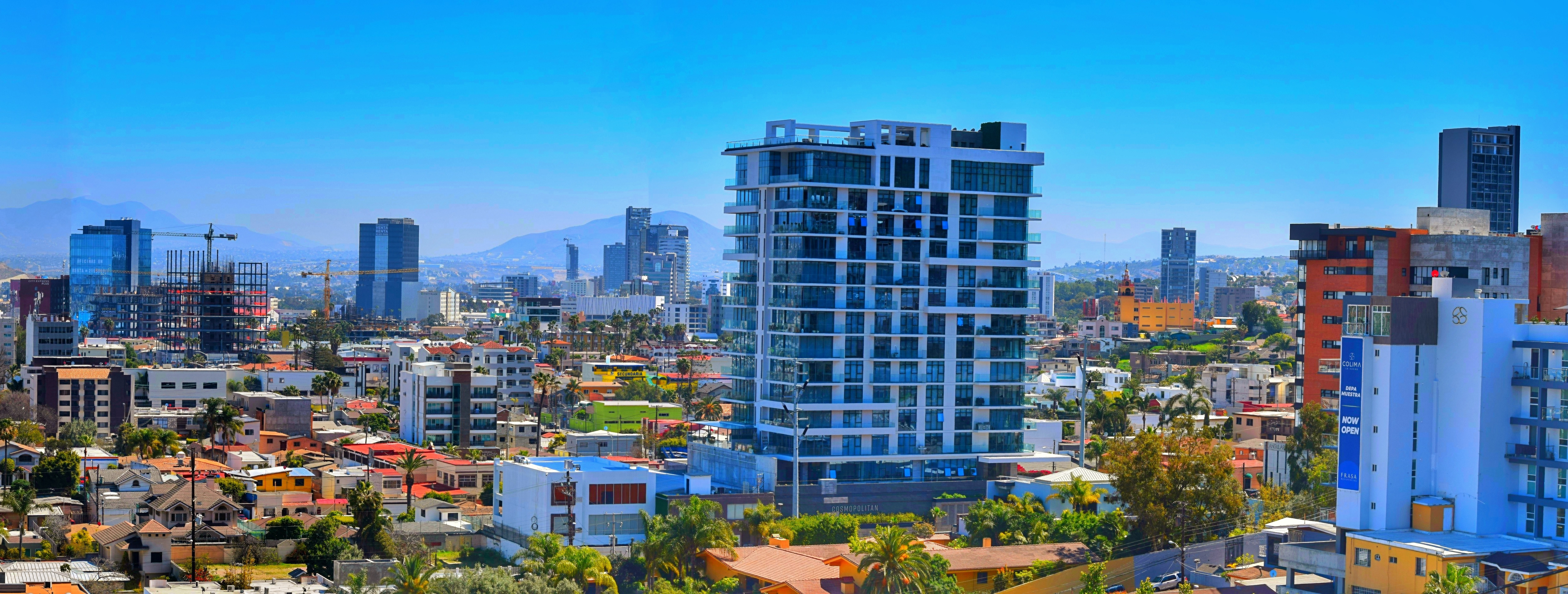
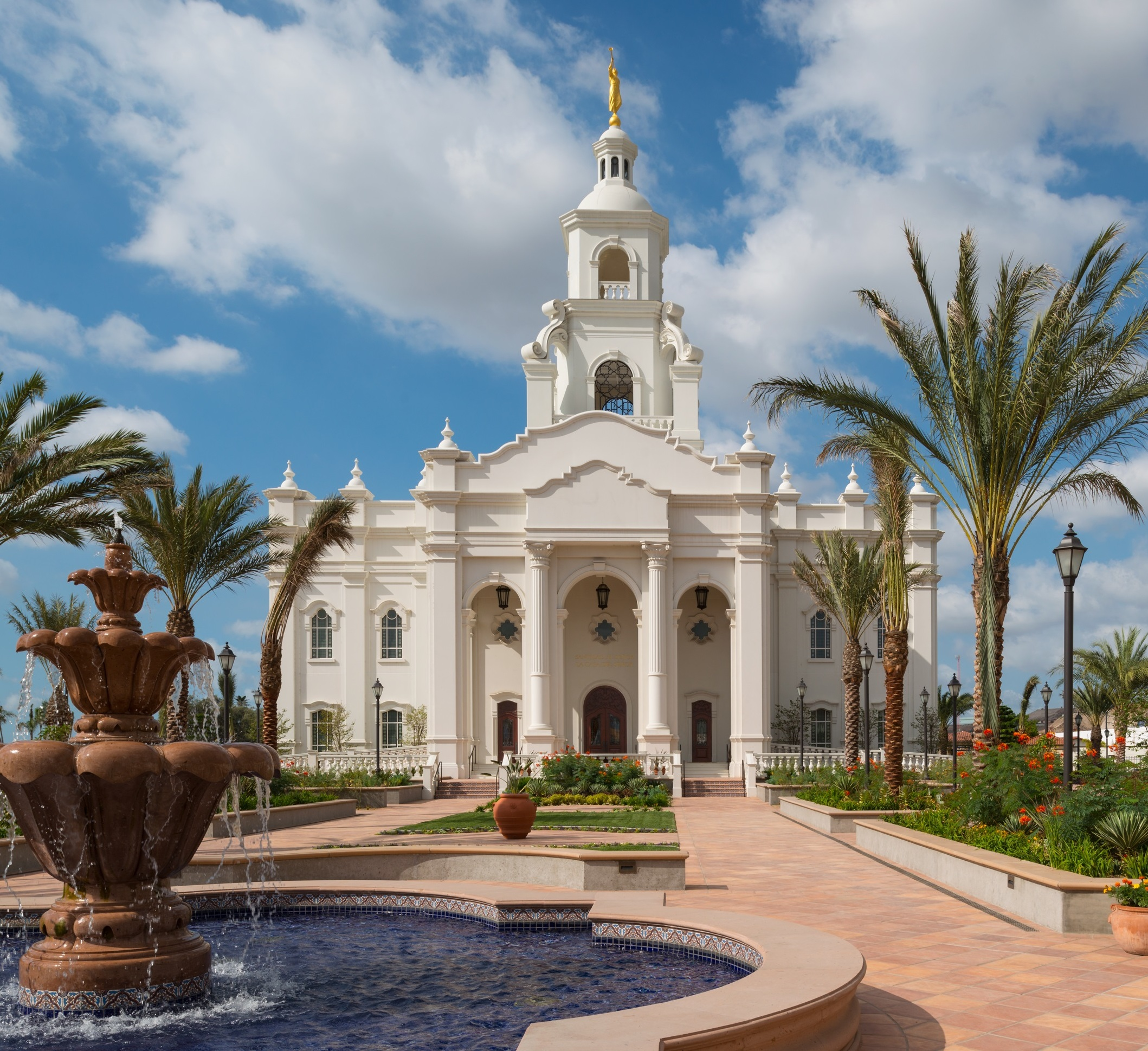
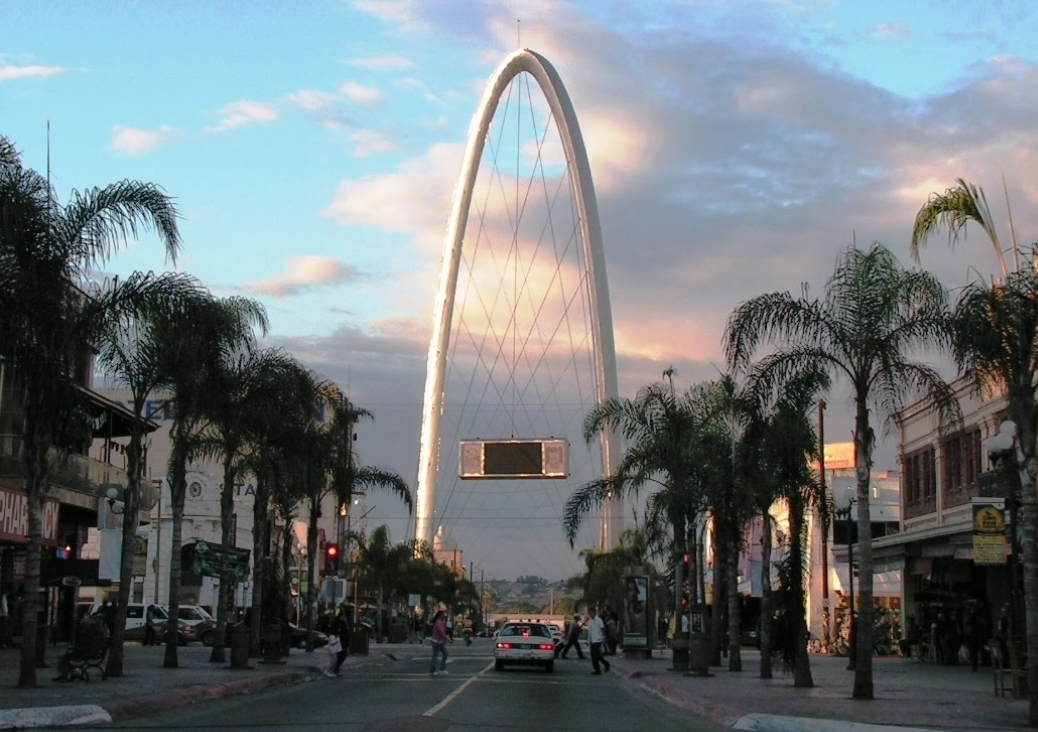
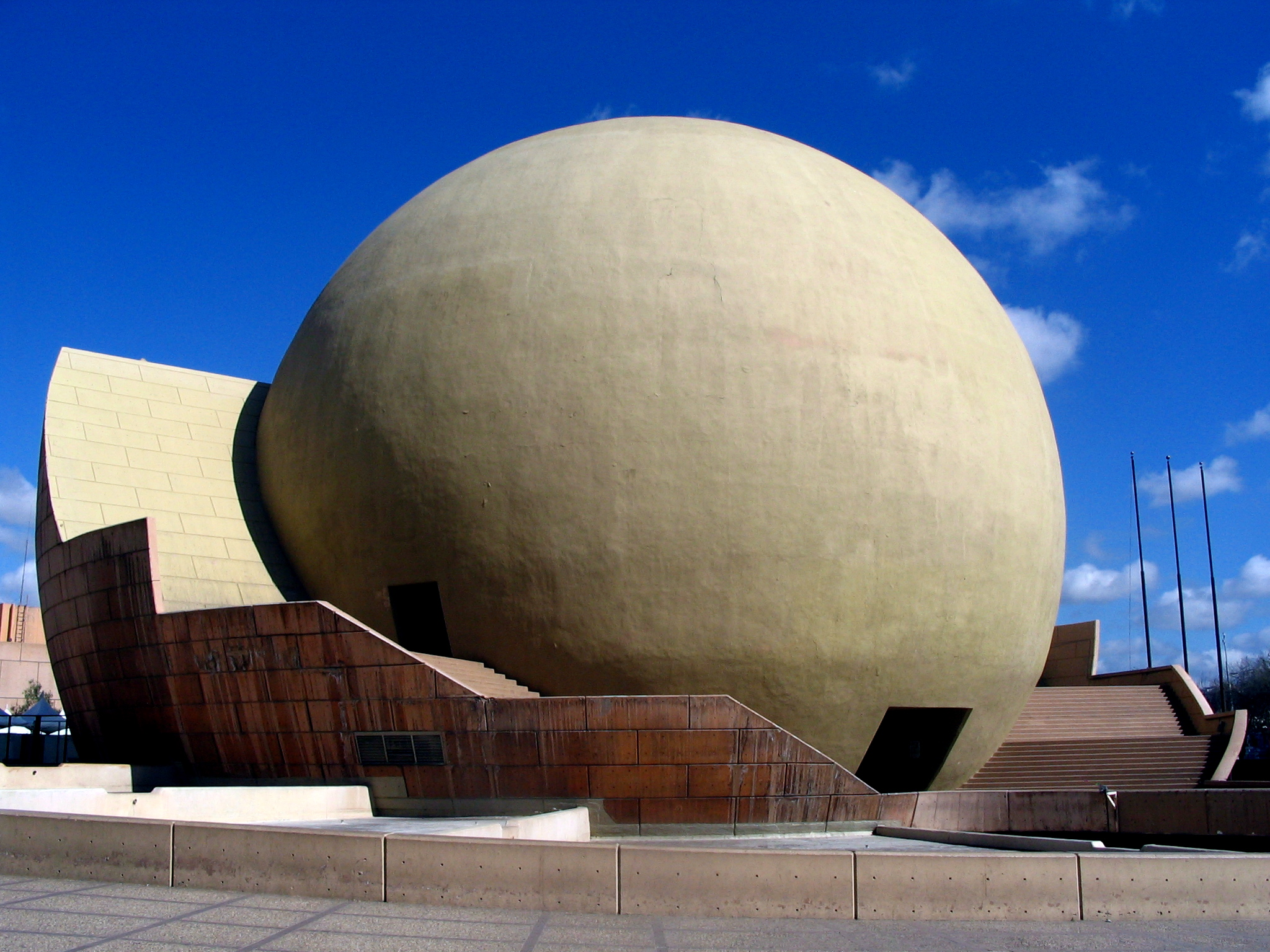
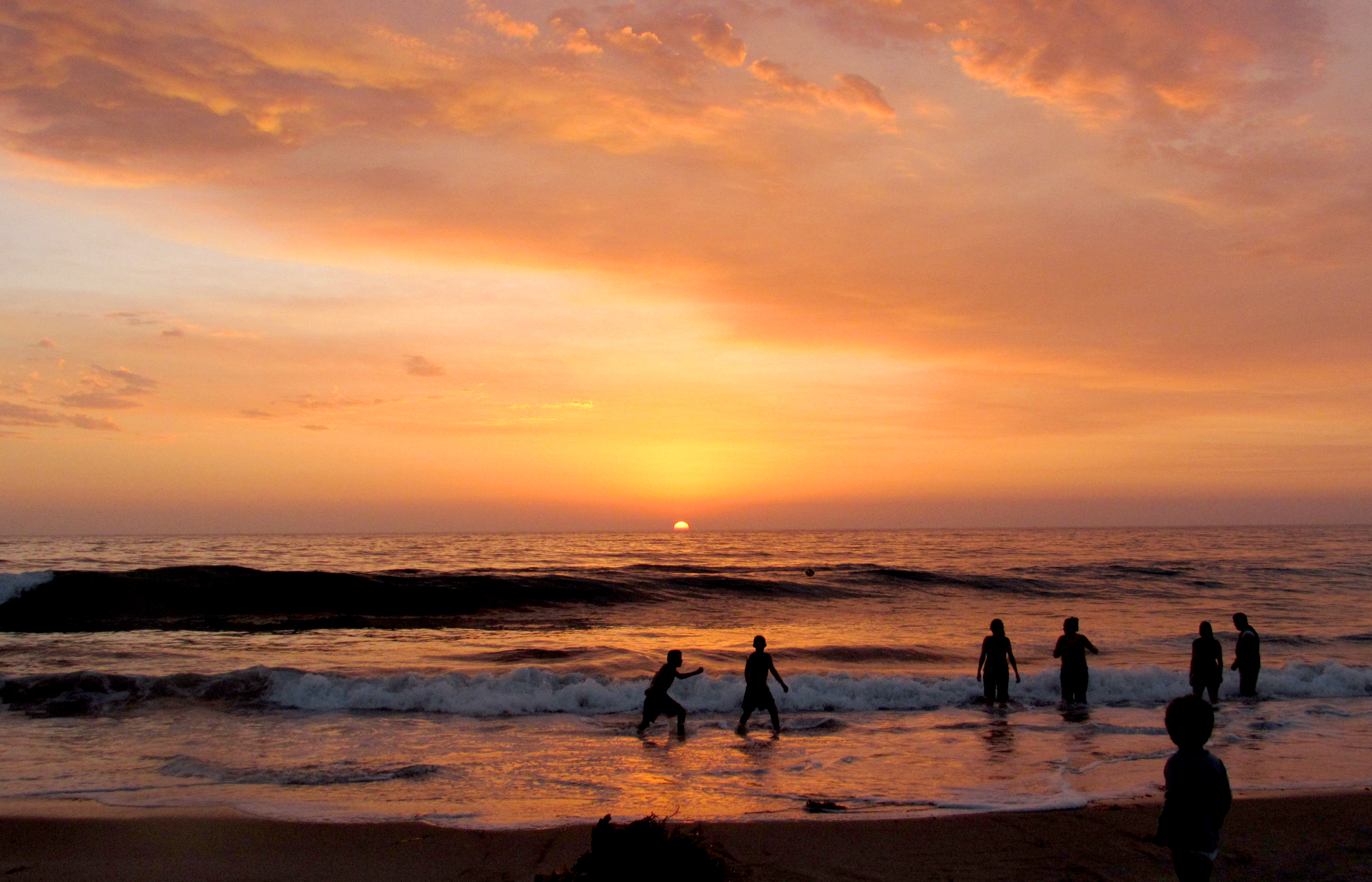
- Skyline of Tijuana in 2021 Tijuana Temple Arco Monumental Tijuana Cultural Center Playas de Tijuana

- Flag Coat of arms
- Nickname: Gateway to Mexico
- Motto: Aquí empieza la patria ("The fatherland begins here")
- Location within Baja California Location within Mexico Location within North America
- Coordinates: 32°31′30″N 117°02′0″W
- Country: Mexico
- State: Baja California
- Municipality: Tijuana
- Founded: 11 July 1889

Government
  - Type: Ayuntamiento
  - Mayor: Ismael Burgueño (MORENA)

Area
  - City: 637 km^{2} (246 sq mi)
  - Metro: 1,392.5 km^{2} (537.6 sq mi)
- Elevation: 20 m (66 ft)

Population (2020)
  - City: 1,810,645
  - Rank: 9th in North America; 2nd in Mexico
  - Density: 2,832.5/km^{2} (7,336/sq mi)
  - Urban: 2,002,000 (estimated)
  - Metro: 2,157,853
  - Metro density: 1,549.6/km^{2} (4,013.5/sq mi)
- Demonym(s): Tijuanan (in Spanish) Tijuanense

GDP (PPP, constant 2015 values)
  - Year: 2023
  - Total (Metro): $61.0 billion
  - Per capita: $27,600
- Time zone: UTC−08:00 (Zona Noroeste)
  - Summer (DST): UTC−07:00 (DST)
- Postal codes: 22000–22699
- Area code: + 52 664/663
- Website: www.tijuana.gob.mx

Tijuana (Note: Pronunciation: /tiːˈhwɑːnə/ tee-HWAH-nə, also US: /ˌtiːəˈwɑːnə/ TEE-ə-WAH-nə – based on the obsolete Spanish form Tía Juana –, UK: /tɪˈhwɑːnə/ ti-HWAH-nə; Spanish: [tiˈxwana].) is the most populous city of the Mexican state of Baja California, located on the northwestern Pacific Coast of Mexico. It is the municipal seat of the Tijuana Municipality, the hub of the Tijuana metropolitan area and the most populous city in northern Mexico. Tijuana is just south of California and is adjacent to the Mexico–United States border which is part of the San Diego–Tijuana metro area. It is the second-largest city in Mexico, after Mexico City, with 1,810,645 inhabitants.

Tijuana is the 27th largest city in the Americas, and is the westernmost city in Mexico. As of 2024, the population of Tijuana has increased to 2,297,000, reflecting a growth of 1.63% since 2023. The international metropolitan region including San Diego was estimated at 5,158,459 in 2016, making it the third-largest metropolitan area in the Californias, 19th-largest metropolitan area in the Americas, and the largest bi-national conurbation that is shared between the US and Mexico. The city is one of the fastest-growing metro areas in the country and rated as a "High Sufficiency" global city by the Globalization and World Cities Research Network.

Tijuana traces its modern history to the arrival of Spanish colonists in the 16th century who were mapping the coast of the Californias. Following the division of the Californias after the American Conquest of California, Tijuana found itself located on an international border, giving rise to a new economic and political structure. The city was incorporated on 11 July 1889 as urban development began. The city has served as a major tourist destination since the 1880s. Today, Tijuana is a dominant manufacturing center for North America, hosting facilities of many multinational conglomerate companies. In the early 21st century, Tijuana has emerged as the medical device manufacturing capital of North America and is increasingly recognized as an important cultural Mecca for the border region of the Californias. The city is the most visited border city in the world, sharing a border of about 24 km (15 mi) with its sister city San Diego. More than fifty million people cross the border between these two cities every year.

Despite its popularity as a tourist destination, Tijuana suffers from a high amount of crime, especially violent crime, due to the extensive presence of organized crime and Mexican cartels. It regularly ranks among the most violent cities by homicide rate. According to Statista in August 2023, Tijuana had the second highest homicide rate in the world. Incidents involving the murder or kidnapping of foreigners since the 2000s have also sparked travel fears and affected Tijuana's status among international tourists.

== Name ==
The city's name comes from the rancho that Santiago Argüello Moraga established in 1829 on his Mexican land grant, naming it Rancho Tía Juana.

The first Spanish mission referred to the settlement variously as Rancho Tía Juana, Tihuan and finally, Tijuana. While the city was founded as "Tijuana" in 1889, "Tia Juana" remained the English-language name for the river, as well as a U.S. settlement that is now part of San Ysidro, until approximately 1916.

The commonly accepted theory among historians is that Tía Juana, as Argüello named his rancho, is derived from the word Tiwan ("by the sea") in the language of the Kumeyaay—the First Nations people of the San Diego-Tijuana region. Urban legend, on the other hand, states that Tía Juana, which means "Aunt Jane" in Spanish, was a real person whose inn provided food and lodging to travelers. There is, however, no record of such an inn; in fact, the first building in the area was built by Argüello in any case, after naming his ranch Rancho Tía Juana.

== History ==
The land was originally inhabited by the Kumeyaay, a tribe of Yuman-speaking hunter-gatherers. Europeans arrived in 1542, when colonist Juan Rodríguez Cabrillo toured the coastline of the area, which Sebastián Vizcaíno mapped in 1602. In 1769, Juan Crespí documented more details about the area that was later called the Valley of Tijuana.

=== 19th century ===
Further settlement took place near the end of the mission era when José María de Echeandía, governor of the Baja California and Alta California, awarded a large land grant to Santiago Argüello in 1829. This large cattle ranch, Rancho Tía Juana, covered 100 km^{2} (40 sq mi). Although "Tia Juana" means "Aunt Jane" in Spanish, the name was actually an adaptation of the word 'Tihuan' or 'Tijuán' in the Kumeyaay language, the name of a nearby Kumeyaay settlement and whose meaning is disputed.

In 1848, as a result of the Mexican–American War with the United States, Mexico lost Alta California. While the majority of the 1,000 Hispanic families living in Alta California stayed on the American side, some moved south to Tijuana to remain inside Mexico, which was now in Baja California as the division between the Californias moved north in between San Diego and Tijuana. Because of this Tijuana gained a different purpose on the international border. The area had been populated by ranchers, but Tijuana developed a new social economic structure which were farming and livestock grazing, plus as a transit area for prospectors.

Urban settlement began in 1889, when descendants of Santiago Argüello and Augustín Olvera entered an agreement to begin developing the city of Tijuana. The date of the agreement, 11 July 1889, is recognized as the founding of the city. Tijuana saw its future in tourism from the beginning. From the late 19th century to the first few decades of the 20th century, the city attracted large numbers of Californians coming for trade and entertainment. The California land boom of the 1880s led to the first big wave of tourists, who were called "excursionists" and came looking for echoes of the famous novel Ramona by Helen Hunt Jackson.

=== 20th century ===
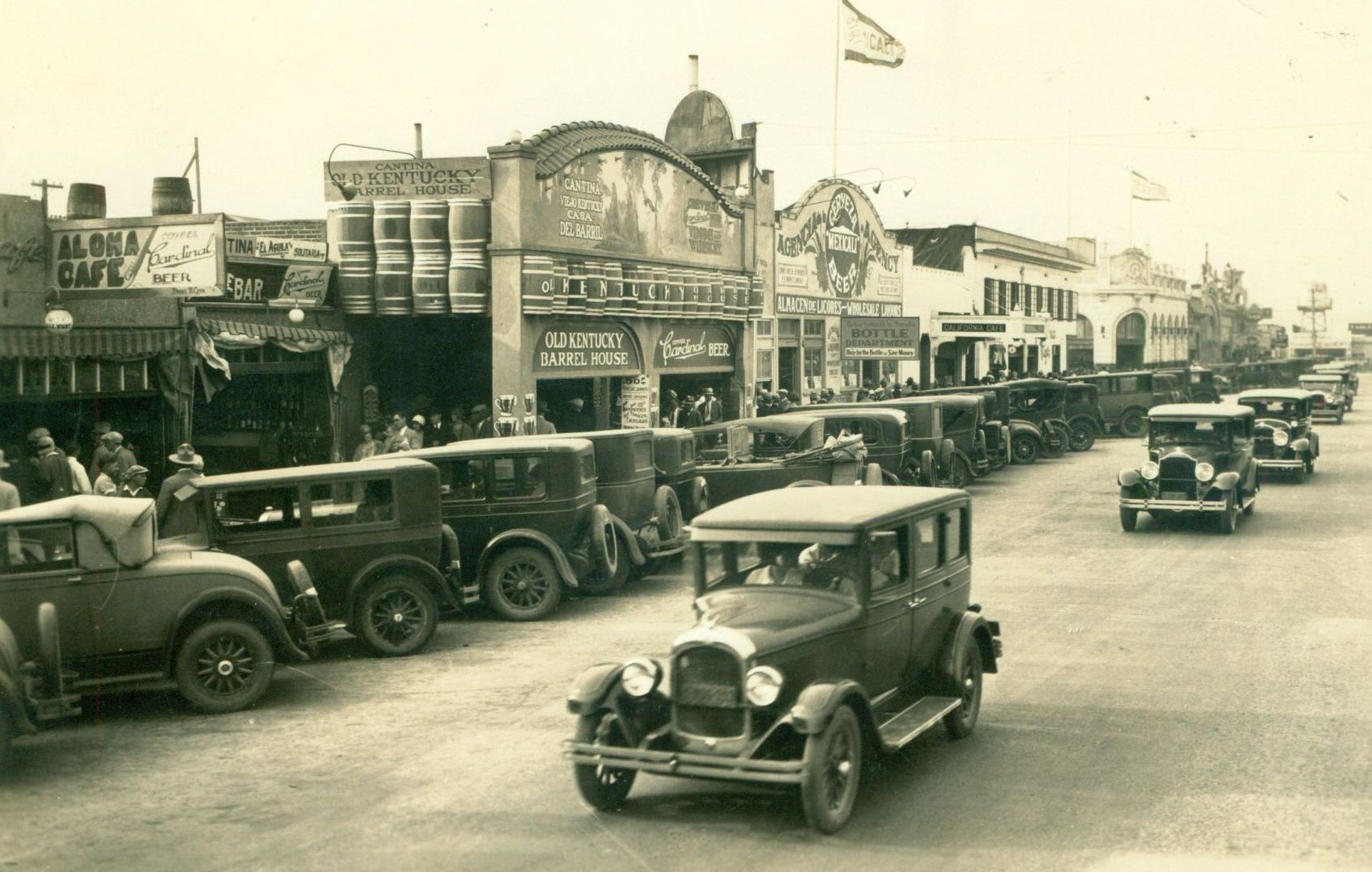
Downtown Tijuana in the 1920s

In 1911, during the Mexican Revolution, revolutionaries claiming loyalty to Ricardo Flores Magón took over the city for shortly over a month. Federal troops then arrived. Assisted by the "defensores de Tijuana", they routed the revolutionaries, who fled north and were promptly arrested by the United States Army.

The Panama–California Exposition of 1915 brought many visitors to the nearby California city of San Diego. Tijuana attracted these tourists with a Feria Típica Mexicana – Typical Mexican Fair. This included curio shops, regional food, thermal baths, horse racing and boxing.

The first professional race track opened in January 1916, just south of the border gate. It was almost immediately destroyed by the great "Hatfield rainmaker" flood of 1916. Rebuilt in the general area, it ran horse races until the new Agua Caliente track opened in 1929, several miles south and across the river on higher ground.

Legal drinking and gambling attracted U.S. nationals in the 1920s during Prohibition. The Avenida Revolución area became the city's tourist center, with casinos and the birthplace of the Caesar salad.

In 1925, the city by presidential decree changed its name to Ciudad Zaragoza, but its name reverted to Tijuana in 1929.

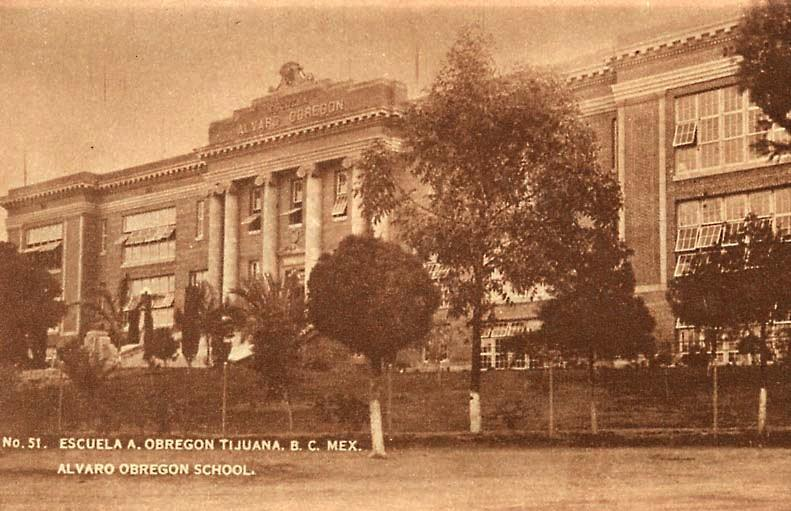
Álvaro Obregón School in 1930

In 1928, the Agua Caliente Touristic Complex was opened, including hotel, spa, dog-track, private airport, golf course and gambling casino. A year later, the new Agua Caliente Racetrack joined the complex. During the eight years it operated, the Agua Caliente hotel, casino and spa achieved a near mythical status, with Hollywood stars and gangsters flying in and playing. Rita Hayworth was discovered there. Musical nightclub productions were broadcast over the radio. A singer known as "la Faraona" got shot in a love-triangle and gave birth to the myth of a beautiful lady ghost. Remnants of the Agua Caliente casino can be seen in the outdoor swimming pool and the "minarete" (actually a former incinerator chimney) nearby the southern end of Avenida Sanchez Taboada, on the grounds of what is now the Lázaro Cárdenas educational complex. A replica of the iconic bell tower (which once stood at the resort entrance) now stands at the beginning of Boulevard Agua Caliente, about two miles west of the old resort.

In 1935, President Cárdenas decreed an end to gambling and casinos in Baja California, and the Agua Caliente complex faltered, then closed. In 1939, it was reopened as a junior high school (now, Preparatoria Lázaro Cárdenas). The buildings themselves were torn down in the 1970s and replaced by modern scholastic architecture.

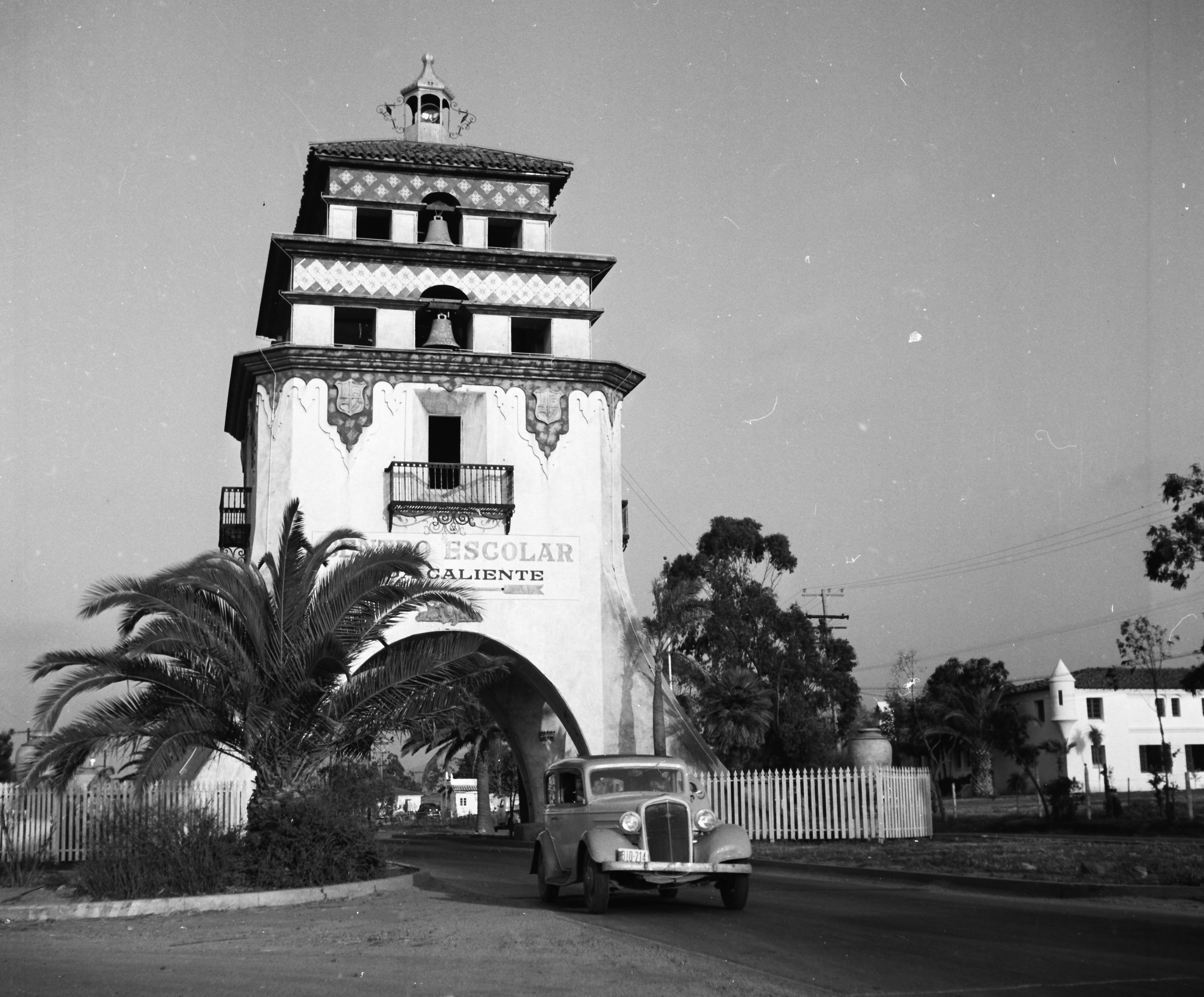
Agua Caliente Casino in 1951

With increased tourism and a large number of Mexican citizens relocating to Tijuana, the city's population grew from 21,971 to 65,364 between 1940 and 1950. With the decline of nightlife and tourism in the 1950s, the city restructured its tourist industry, by promoting a more family-oriented scene. Tijuana developed a greater variety of attractions and activities to offer its visitors.

In 1965, the Mexican federal government launched the Border Industrialization Program to attract foreign investment. Tijuana and other border cities became attractive for foreign companies to open maquiladoras (factories), and the Tijuana economy started to diversify. Manufacturing jobs attracted workers from other parts of Mexico and the city's population grew from less than half a million in 1980 to almost 1 million in 1985.

In 1972, work began on the first concrete channeling of the Tijuana River; previously the river would flood across a wide plain east and southeast of downtown, inundating an area of cardboard and metal shacks called Cartolandia (“Paperland”). The project removed the shacks and added 1.8 million sq. m. of usable land, on which the Zona Río was built. With the 1981 opening of the Plaza Río Tijuana mall and the 1982 Tijuana Cultural Center (CECUT), Zona Río became the new commercial center of a modern Tijuana, and with its new boulevards with monument-filled glorietas (roundabouts), reminiscent of the grand Paseo de la Reforma in Mexico City, the city created the new image and allure of a modern, large city, rather than just a border town focused on tourism and vice.

In 1994, PRI presidential candidate Luis Donaldo Colosio was assassinated in Tijuana while making an appearance in the plaza of Lomas Taurinas, a neighborhood nestled in a valley near Centro. The shooter was caught and imprisoned, but doubts remain about who the mastermind might have been.

=== 21st century ===
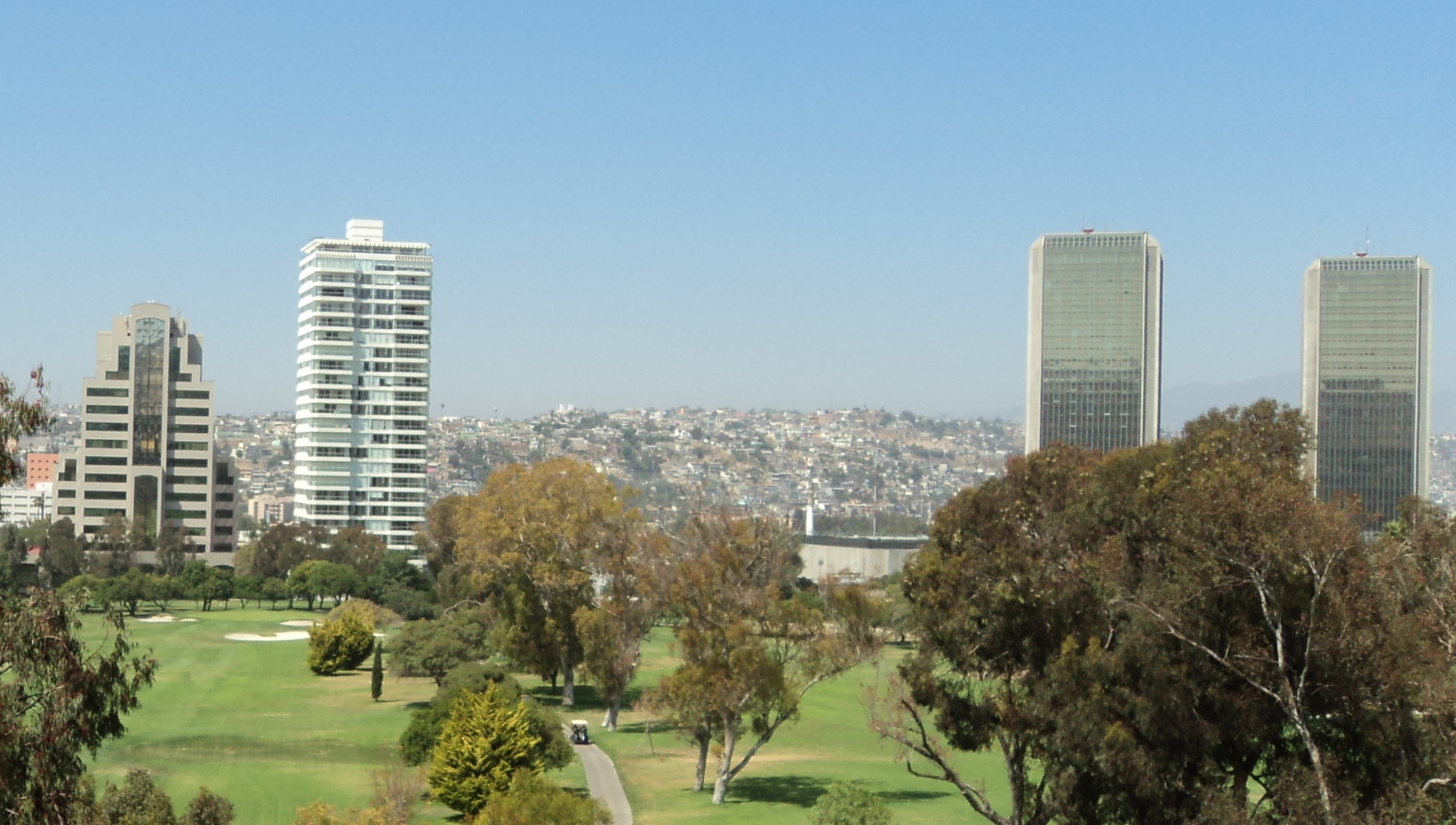
The number of skyscrapers and high rises in Tijuana has grown significantly in the 21st century.

After 9/11, tighter US border controls resulted in hours-long waits to return to the US. The number of US visitors dropped sharply due to this factor, as well as subsequent drug violence.

Around 2008, thousands of Tijuana's elite bought houses in and moved to Bonita and Eastlake in Chula Vista, California, to escape violence, kidnapping and other crimes taking place during that period. An article in The Los Angeles Times reported that the emigration to San Diego County has transformed the demographic and cultural character of some cities to a degree.

In recent years, Tijuana has become an important city of commerce and migration for Mexico and US. In spite of the violence and border crossing issues, the city has received a large number of tourists from US, China, Japan and the south of Mexico. Thanks to the realization of cultural and business festivals, the city has improved its image before the world, standing out as a competitive city for investment. Currently, the commercial and business sector is committed to the boom in the gastronomic industry, craft beer, entertainment, and real estate, as well as medical tourism, to attract visitors and investors.

== Geography ==
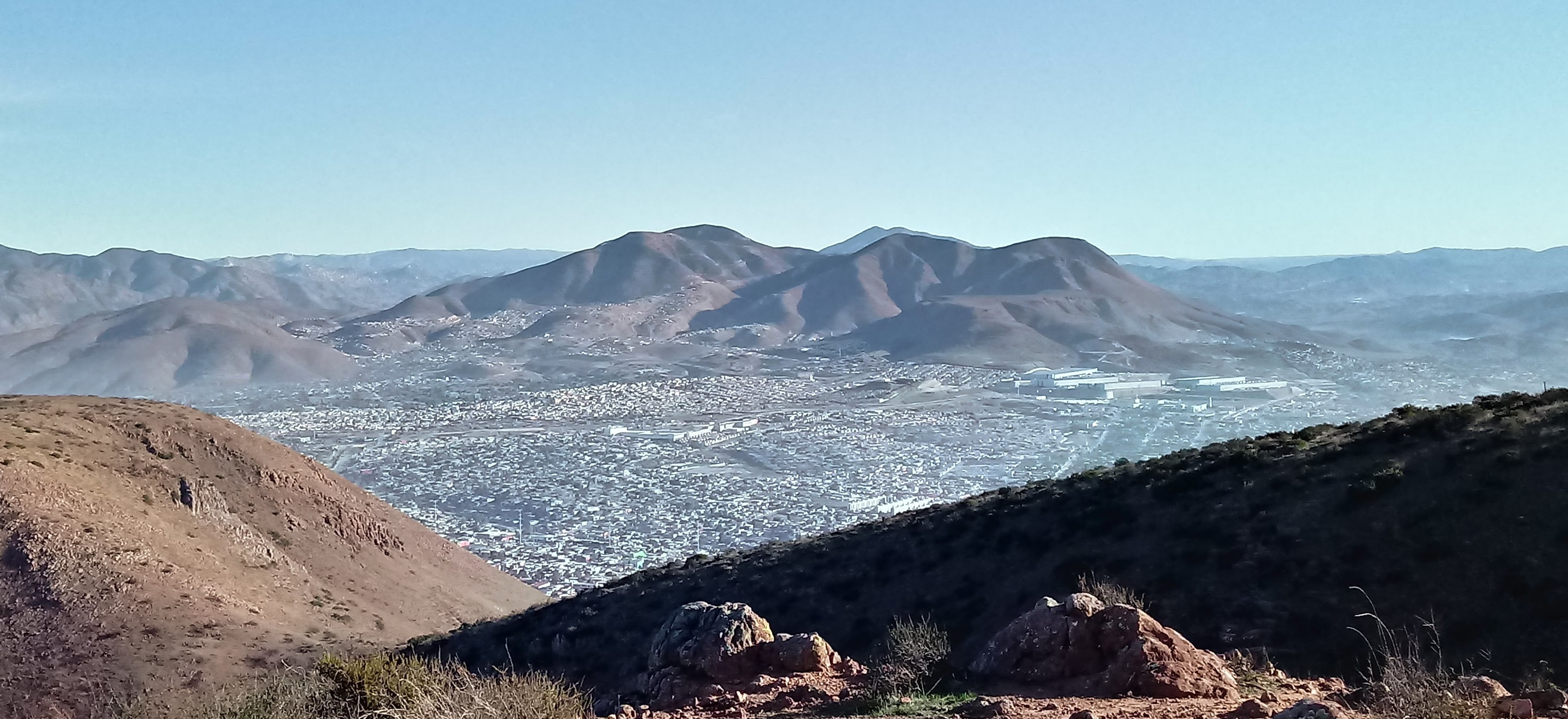
View of the Cerro San Isidro from across the valley from Cerro Colorado

Tijuana is the westernmost city in Mexico, and consequently in Latin America, and the second-largest city in northern Mexico. Located about 210 kilometers (130 mi) west of the state capital, Mexicali, the city is bordered to the north by the cities of Imperial Beach, and the San Diego neighborhoods of San Ysidro and Otay Mesa, California. To the southwest of the city is Rosarito Beach, while to the south is unincorporated territory of Tijuana Municipality. The city is nestled among hills, canyons, and gullies. The central part of the city lies in a valley through which flows the channeled Tijuana River.

Housing development in the Tijuana Hills has led to eradication of many seasonal mountain streams. This lack of natural drainage makes places within the city vulnerable to landslides during the rainy season. The varied terrain of Tijuana gives the city elevation extremes that range from sea level to 790 meters (2,590 ft). As downtown Tijuana was built at the bottom of the river valley, the district is subject to seasonal flooding created by drain-off from the Tijuana Hills. During this time, east-bound portions of the Via Rapida (east–west highway) may be blocked off by the Tijuana Police due to hazardous conditions.

Tijuana is noted for its rough terrain, which includes many canyons, steep hills, and mesas. Large hills in Tijuana include the Cerro Colorado and the Cerro de las Abejas.

The city is located near the terminus of the Tijuana River and within the Tijuana River Basin. The Tijuana River is an intermittent river, 195 km (121 mi) long, on the Pacific coast of northern Baja California in Mexico and Southern California in the United States. It drains an arid area along the California–Baja California border, flowing through Mexico for most of its course and then crossing the border for the last 8 km (5 mi) of its course where it forms an estuary that empties into the ocean.

=== Cityscape ===
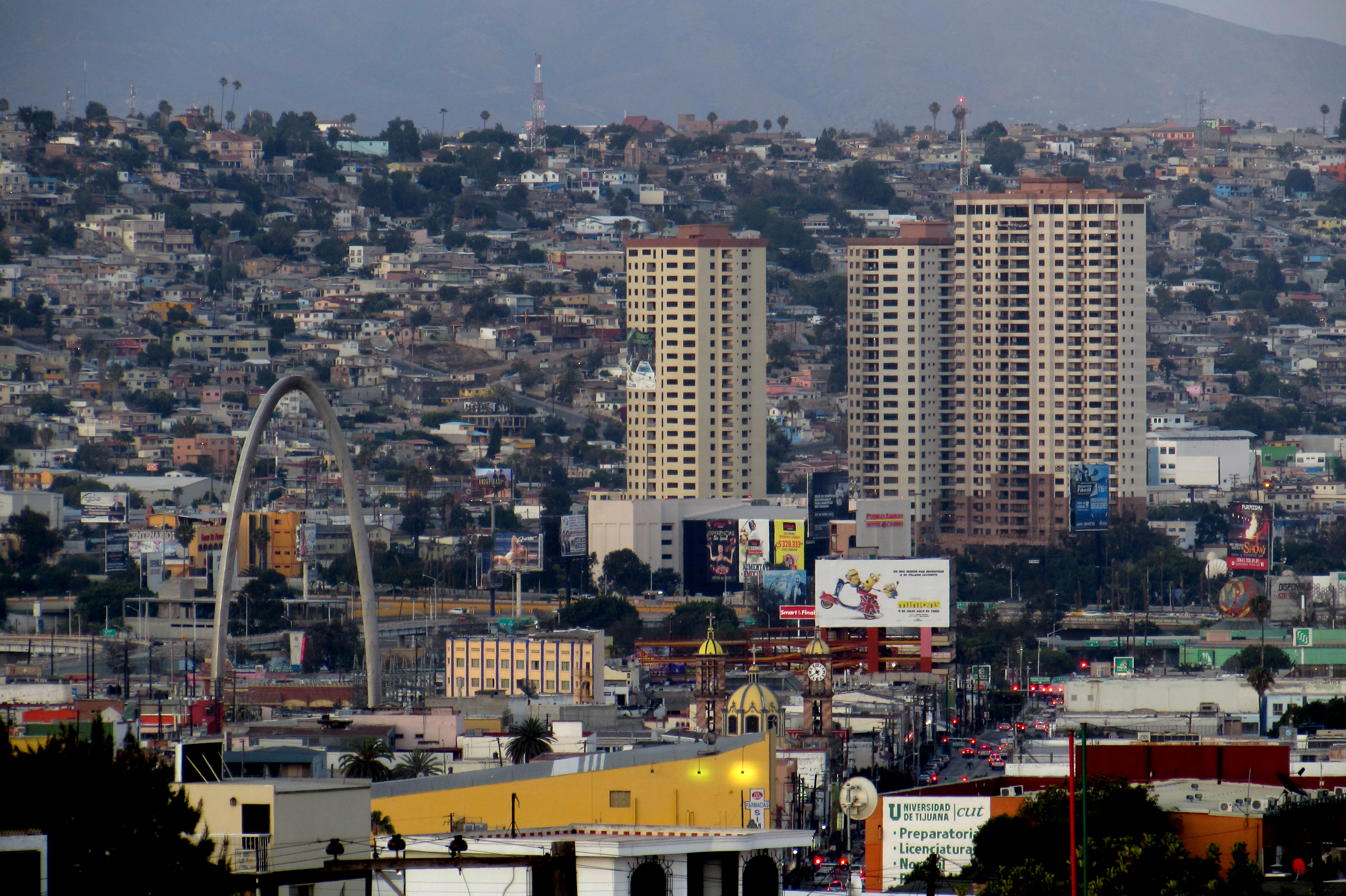
View of Downtown Tijuana

The city's skyscraper history is relatively recent. Some of the first highrise building complexes constructed in the city were the twin towers of Grand Hotel Tijuana. Tijuana experienced a building boom that was brought to a halt by the Great Recession. Among buildings that succumbed to the time period was the Trump Ocean Resort Baja Mexico that would have been located in Playas and reached 98 m (322 ft). Currently the tallest building, and soon to be the largest complex in footage, New City Residential reaches 102 m (335 ft). Overall, the city maintains 33 completed structures with other proposed and under-construction skyscrapers.

The Tijuana skyline is the fifth largest skyline in Mexico and is located in the Zona Rio and to a smaller extent, Playas de Tijuana. In the Zona Rio the buildings are concentrated on the Tijuana River, lined parallel to the river; and on the edges of the Tijuana Country Club. In Playas the high rises are currently focused on the coast. Recent construction on high rises has begun in the aforementioned areas, as buildings such as New City Residential and Grand Hotel Tijuana have been developed and taken prominent places in the skyline as the tallest buildings. From Tijuana's skyline the San Diego skyline can also be seen, although the reverse is mostly not true on account of the high hills surrounding central Tijuana.

=== Boroughs ===
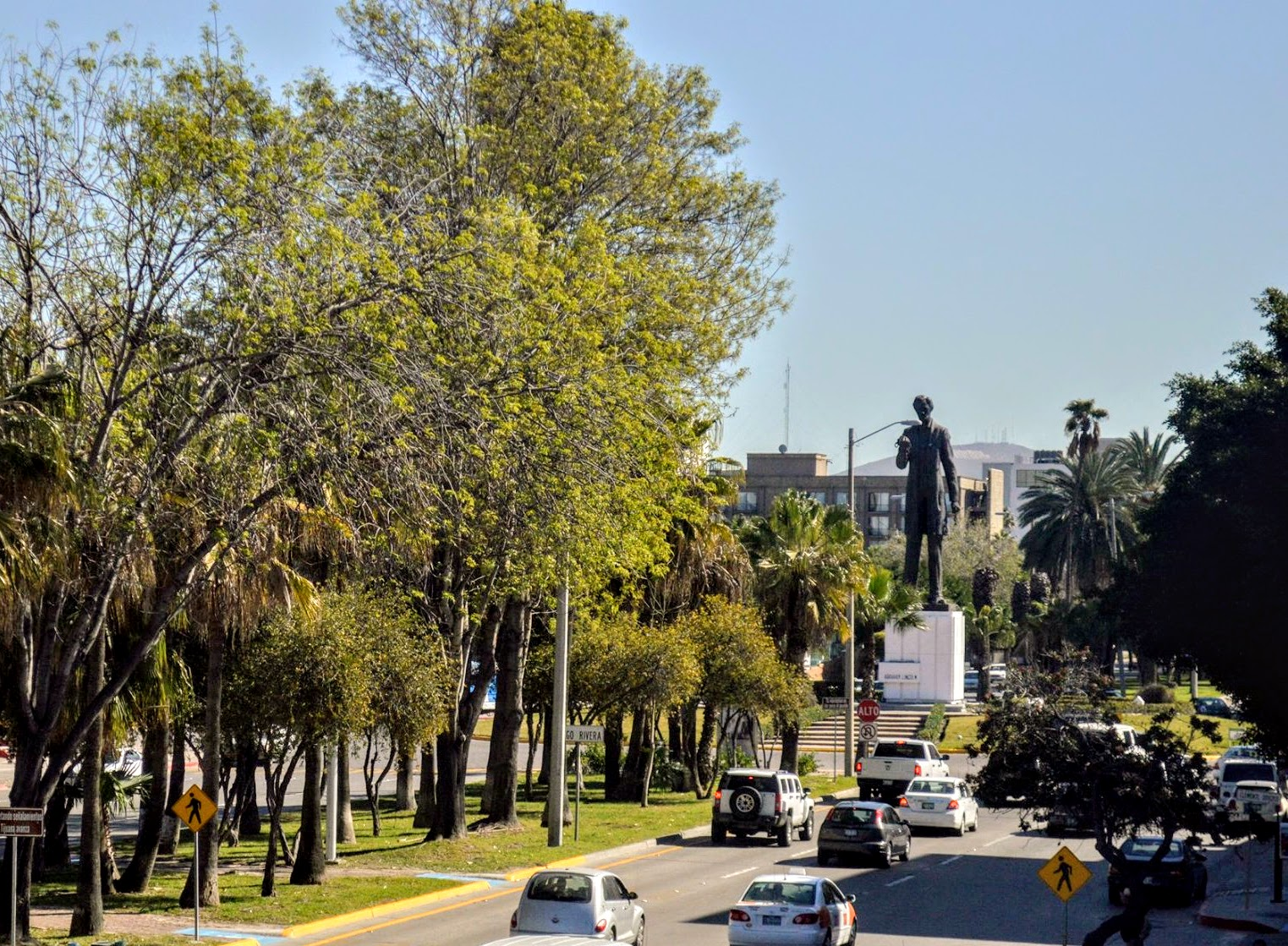
View down Paseo de los Héroes of the Abraham Lincoln Monument

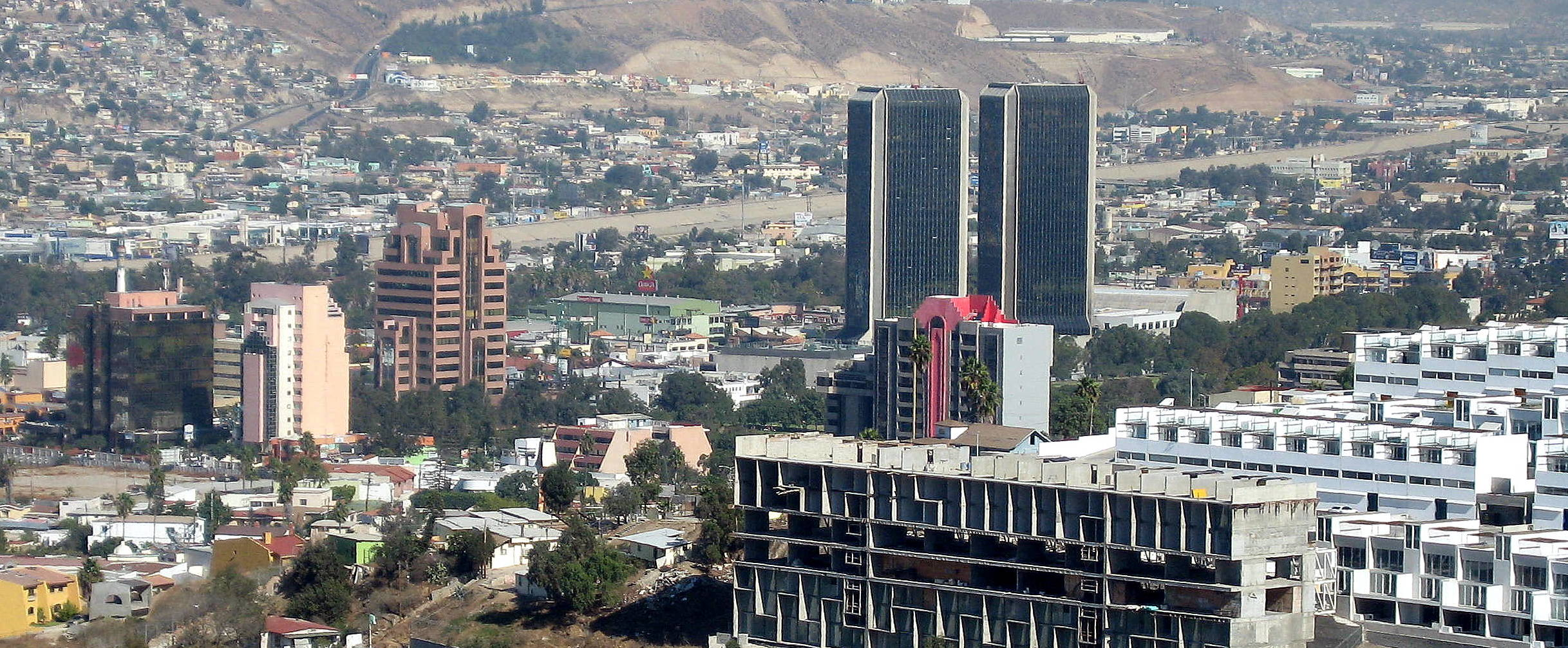
Skyscrapers on Blvd. Agua Caliente.

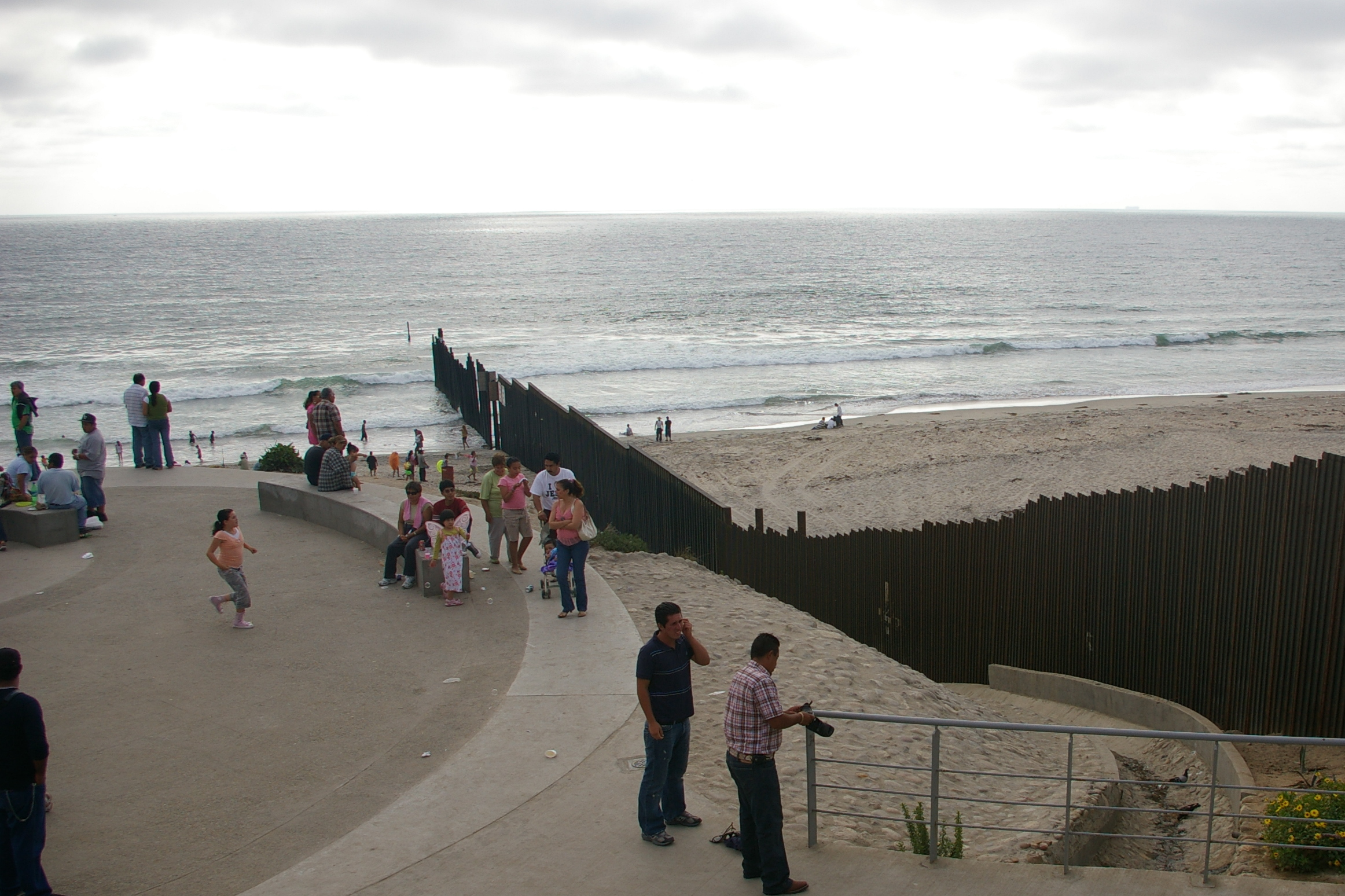
The Mexico–United States barrier at the Pacific Coast

The municipality of Tijuana is divided into eight administrative boroughs, or Delegaciones. The Tijuana metropolitan area occupies all of borough seats. The boroughs are in turn divided into colonias or ejidos. These boroughs offer administrative services such as urban planning, civil registry, inspection, verification, public works and community development and are served by a delegado.

- Centro – "Delegación Centro" includes the old downtown (Zona Centro), new business district (Zona Río), red light district (Zona Norte), and other adjacent neighborhoods ("zonas"). This is the historical midpoint of Tijuana; the municipal palace is located here as well as most of the tourist zones, such as Avenida Revolución and the business district. The Tijuana Cultural Center (CECUT for CEntro CUltural de Tijuana) is located here as well as the Plaza Río Tijuana, until recently the largest mall in the state, within the Zona Rio.
- Cerro Colorado – The Cerro Colorado ("Red Hill") is located here and it is surrounded by houses. Because of its height many of the area's antennas for radio and television stations are located on its peak.
- La Mesa – This is where the Morelos Park, the largest public park in the city, is located, as well as the retail and transit hub Cinco y Diez, Plaza Mundo Divertido, the new Macroplaza and the CETYS University.
- Otay Centenario – This borough was created in 2014 by merging Mesa de Otay and Centenario boroughs. The Tijuana International Airport, Tijuana campus of the Autonomous University of Baja California and the local branch of the Technological Institute of Mexico are also located here as well as many maquiladoras. This is the borough with the largest number of factories and maquiladoras. Its largest colony is Ciudad Industrial ("Industrial City"). This delegation contains the Otay Mesa entry to the United States and the Friendship Park (Parque de la amistad).
- Playas de Tijuana – This is the westernmost borough of the city bordered by the Pacific Ocean on the west and the United States border on the north. This is where the beaches of Tijuana are located (hence the name) and it is also one of the two exits to the south towards Rosarito and Ensenada.
- La Presa – literally "'the dam'", this is the largest borough in size and the Abelardo L. Rodríguez Dam is located within its limits, hence its name. The new Corredor Tijuana-Rosarito 2000 and the Tijuana-Tecate freeways run through it.
- San Antonio de los Buenos – This is mostly a residential area although it also has two industrial parks.
- Sanchez Taboada – Like the previous borough this is mostly a residential area, but within its borders are located many "maquiladoras" specially at Pacific Industrial Park.

=== Infrastructure ===
After an incident on April 1, 2025, in which a three-story apartment building collapsed after heavy landslides brought by heavy rains, officials have been monitoring different buildings at risk of collapse. Currently, more than 10 large buildings are being monitored by the government for being at risk of collapse. After local research, the reasons for such a high risk of collapse in Tijuana are related to a lack of permits on buildings, expensive housing, and illegal constructions on hills. Due to a rapid increase in population, housing has become unaffordable to most residents. This forced communities to form illegally on top of unutilized hillsides. These hillside communities are at the greatest risk for collapse due to not having any sort of oversight during house construction.

=== Climate ===
Tijuana's climate has a hot semi-arid (Köppen climate classification BSh), with about 231 mm (9.09 in) of annual precipitation, and generally mild to warm weather year-round. It has characteristics of the Mediterranean climate (Csa) found to the immediate north, east, and south east, with most of the annual precipitation falling in the winter, between the months of November and March. Similar to San Diego, there are large summer temperature differences between the immediate coastline and the inner areas of the city. This is due to cold current inflow moderating the seaside temperature swings from the strong solar radiation.

Between November and March, storms originate from fronts entering off of the Pacific Ocean. January is the wettest month of the year for the city and during this time a periodic event, similar to June Gloom, is observed created by marine layer. January is the coolest month, during which temperatures average 13.6 °C (56.5 °F). In the city April signifies the end of winter and the start of Santa Ana winds. Though the daytime highs are generally around 20 °C (68 °F), heat waves can reach up to 33 °C (91 °F). The hottest months in the city are August and September, during which temperatures average 22.0 °C (71.6 °F). Summers are by far the driest time of year since influences from the California Current and the North Pacific High suppress the formation of rainfall caused by the North American Monsoon. Tropical cyclones do impact the city from time to time, however. The most recent to do so was Hurricane Hilary in 2023, which dumped torrential that caused widespread flash floods and landslides.

As in coastal Southern California, air pollution sometimes occurs during periods of temperature inversion, especially during summer and fall, but (unlike Mexico City) is seldom severe and in recent years has lessened due to cleaner car engines.

Frost and snow are rare phenomena in the city as temperatures are usually well above freezing. Yet, in December 1967, snow fell in the city and in January 2007 feather light snow fell in the east of the city. However, excessive amounts of snow fall have never been recorded in the city. On 14 February 2008, a winter storm caused an unusual snowfall in the upper reaches of the hills of the city.

The record low temperature recorded in the city was −6 °C (21 °F), while the highest was 49 °C (120 °F).

Climate data for Tijuana (Tijuana International Airport)
Month	Jan	Feb	Mar	Apr	May	Jun	Jul	Aug	Sep	Oct	Nov	Dec	Year
Record high °C (°F)	34.5 (94.1)	39.0 (102.2)	34.0 (93.2)	36.0 (96.8)	38.5 (101.3)	41.8 (107.2)	39.0 (102.2)	41.0 (105.8)	49.0 (120.2)	47.0 (116.6)	42.0 (107.6)	37.0 (98.6)	49.0 (120.2)
Mean daily maximum °C (°F)	20.3 (68.5)	20.8 (69.4)	20.8 (69.4)	22.1 (71.8)	23.5 (74.3)	25.2 (77.4)	27.8 (82.0)	28.1 (82.6)	27.8 (82.0)	26.0 (78.8)	23.5 (74.3)	21.1 (70.0)	23.9 (75.0)
Daily mean °C (°F)	13.6 (56.5)	14.3 (57.7)	14.8 (58.6)	16.1 (61.0)	18.0 (64.4)	19.8 (67.6)	22.2 (72.0)	22.8 (73.0)	22.0 (71.6)	19.5 (67.1)	16.6 (61.9)	14.0 (57.2)	17.8 (64.0)
Mean daily minimum °C (°F)	6.9 (44.4)	7.8 (46.0)	8.8 (47.8)	10.2 (50.4)	12.4 (54.3)	14.3 (57.7)	16.5 (61.7)	17.5 (63.5)	16.1 (61.0)	13.0 (55.4)	9.8 (49.6)	6.9 (44.4)	11.7 (53.1)
Record low °C (°F)	−3.0 (26.6)	0.0 (32.0)	0.5 (32.9)	1.0 (33.8)	5.5 (41.9)	5.0 (41.0)	7.5 (45.5)	10.5 (50.9)	10.0 (50.0)	5.0 (41.0)	1.0 (33.8)	−5.0 (23.0)	−5.0 (23.0)
Average rainfall mm (inches)	43.8 (1.72)	36.5 (1.44)	42.7 (1.68)	17.6 (0.69)	4.4 (0.17)	0.7 (0.03)	0.7 (0.03)	0.9 (0.04)	5.0 (0.20)	7.8 (0.31)	33.8 (1.33)	37.0 (1.46)	230.9 (9.09)
Average rainy days (≥ 0.1 mm)	5.9	4.7	5.9	3.1	1.4	0.5	0.4	0.2	0.7	1.7	3.9	4.3	32.7
Average relative humidity (%)	70	74	73	75	77	79	80	80	79	76	69	69	75
Mean monthly sunshine hours	210.6	209.0	275.8	293.8	327.0	345.7	357.9	331.0	288.8	261.1	227.0	197.7	3,325.4
Source 1: Servicio Meteorologico Nacional
Source 2: Weather.Directory

== Demographics ==
Historical population
Year	Pop.	±%
1980	461,267	—
1985	584,267	+26.7%
1990	698,752	+19.6%
1995	966,097	+38.3%
2000	1,210,820	+25.3%
2005	1,410,687	+16.5%
2010	1,559,683	+10.6%
2015	1,641,570	+5.3%
2020	1,922,523	+17.1%

Tijuana has a diverse cosmopolitan population which includes migrants from other parts of Mexico and from all over the world. Tijuana has one of Mexico's largest Asian populations, predominantly consisting of Chinese immigrants. Tijuana also has a large and rapidly growing population of Americans, mostly from Southern California. Many Latin Americans, notably Cubans, and Guatemalans, have made Tijuana their home. The city also has many Lebanese, Italian, French and Spanish citizens. Recently, the city has received a large influx of Haitian immigrants.

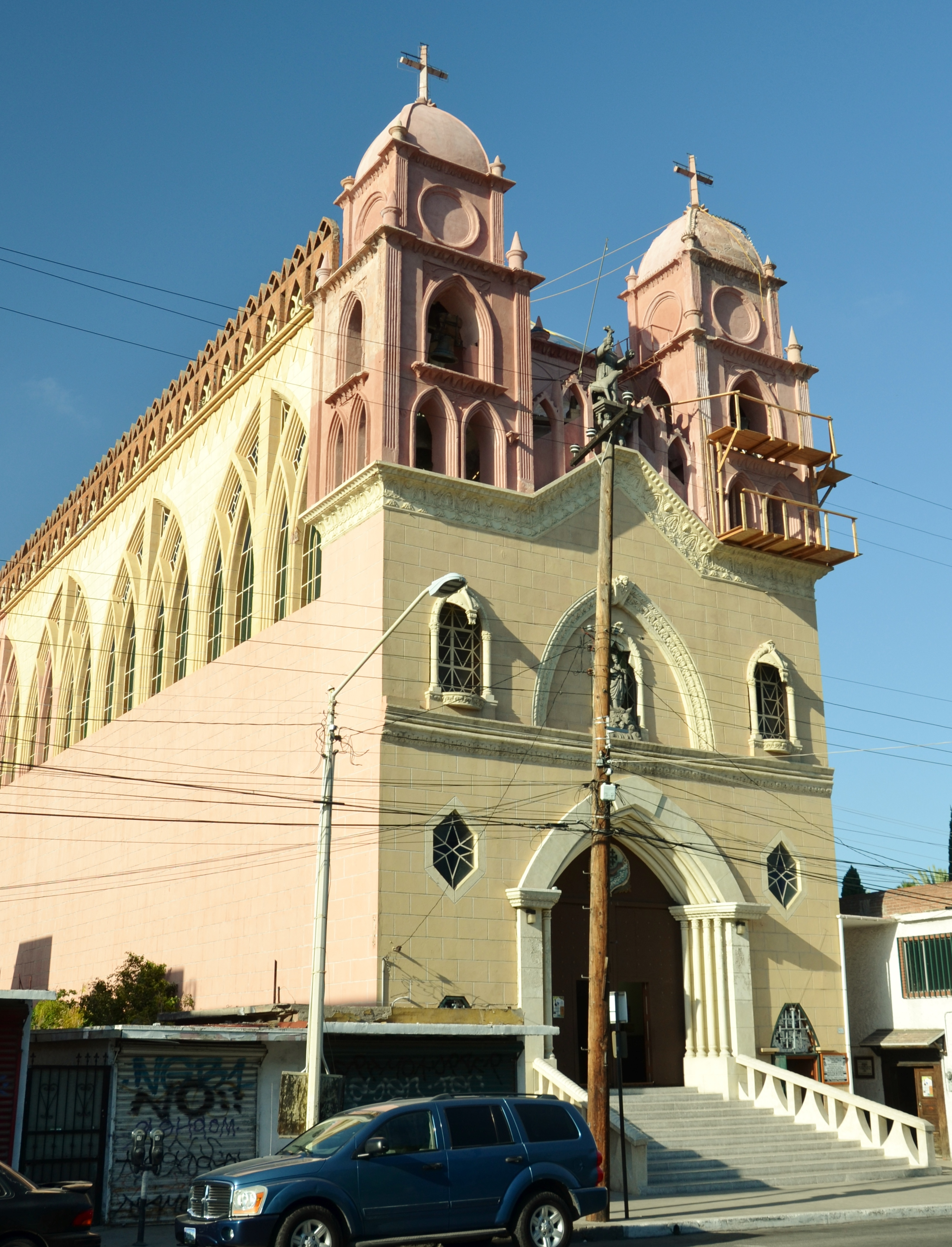
San Francisco de Asís Church, built in 1959

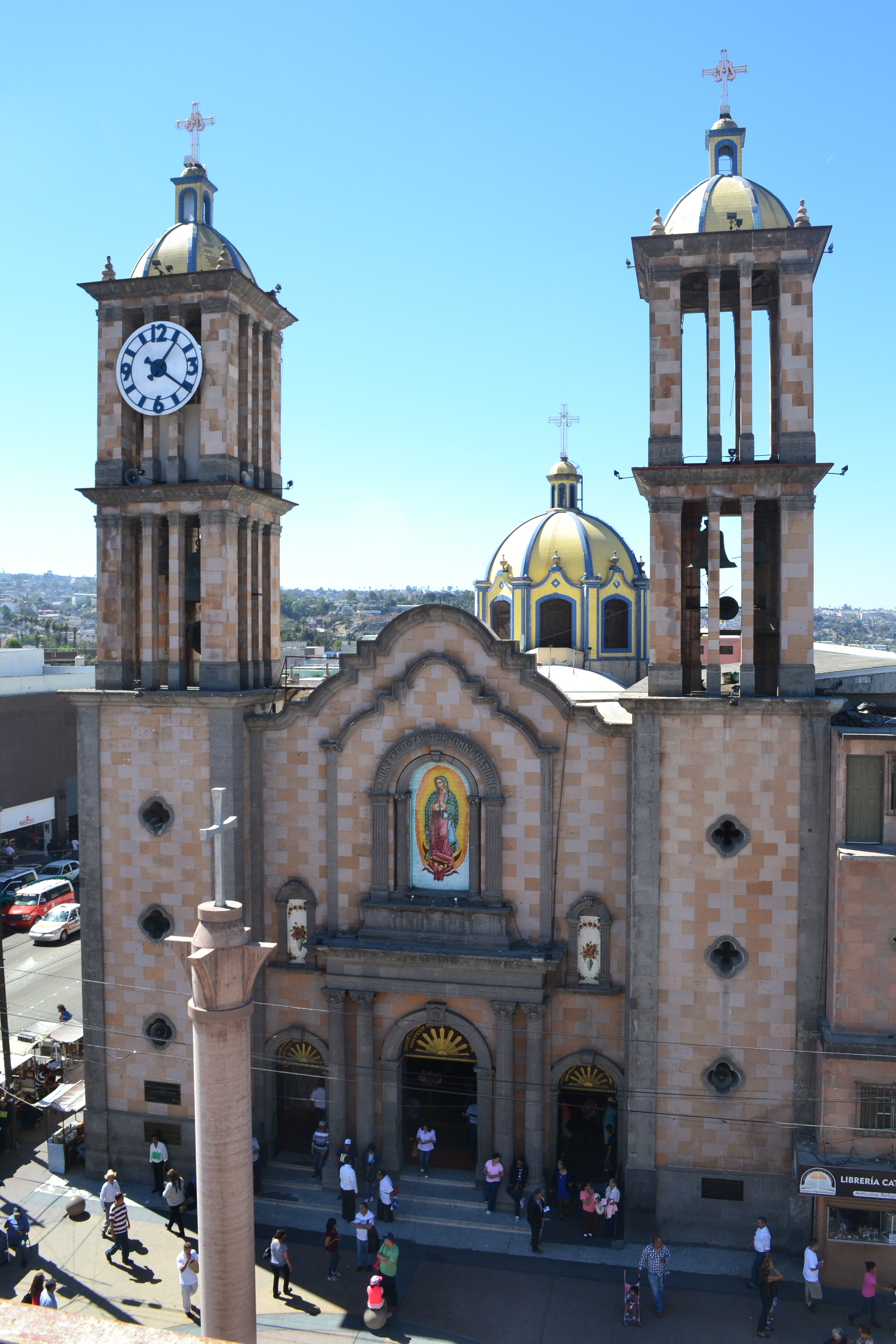
Our Lady of Guadalupe Cathedral of the Catholic Archdiocese of Tijuana

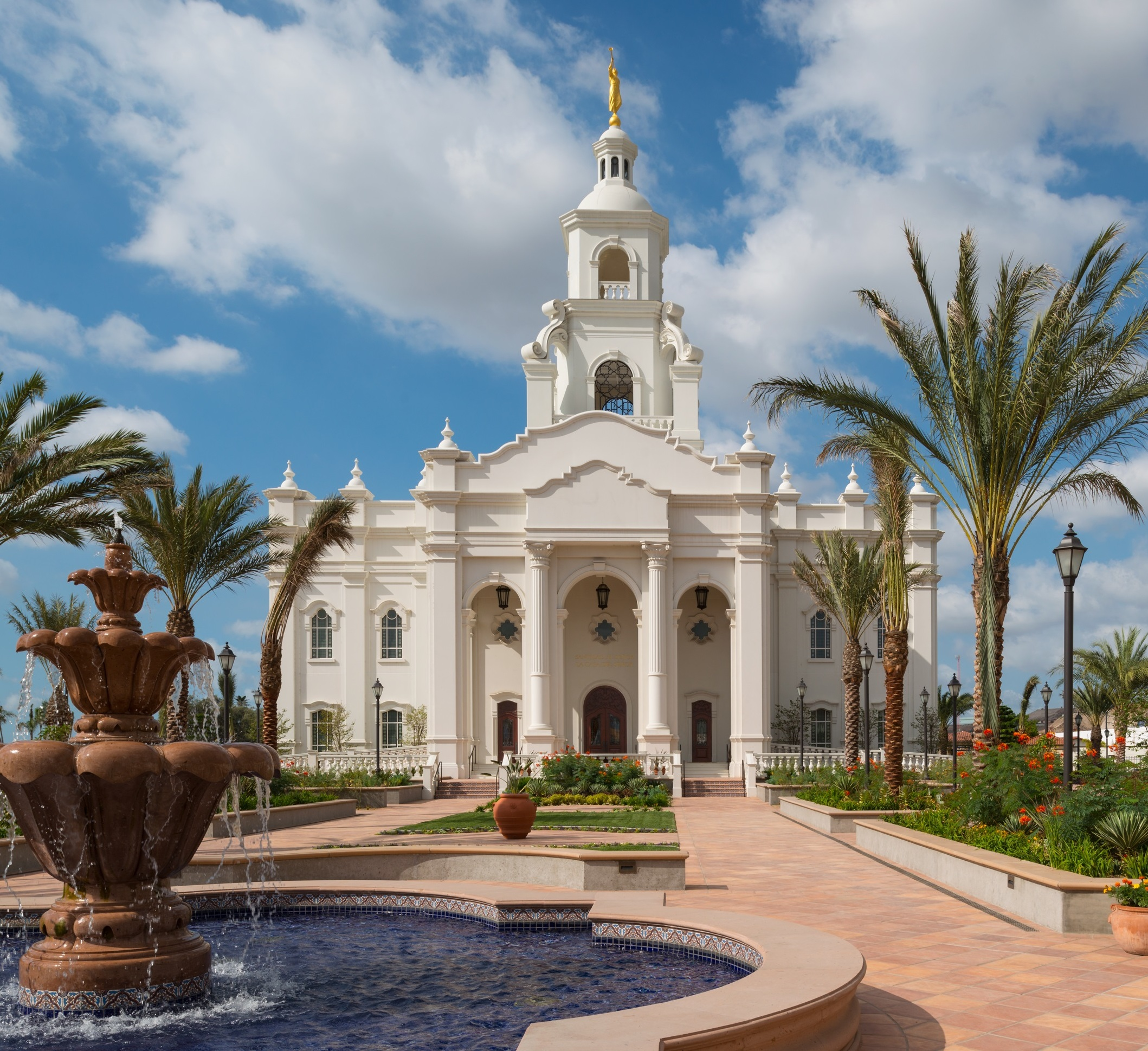
Tijuana Mexico Temple of the LDS Church

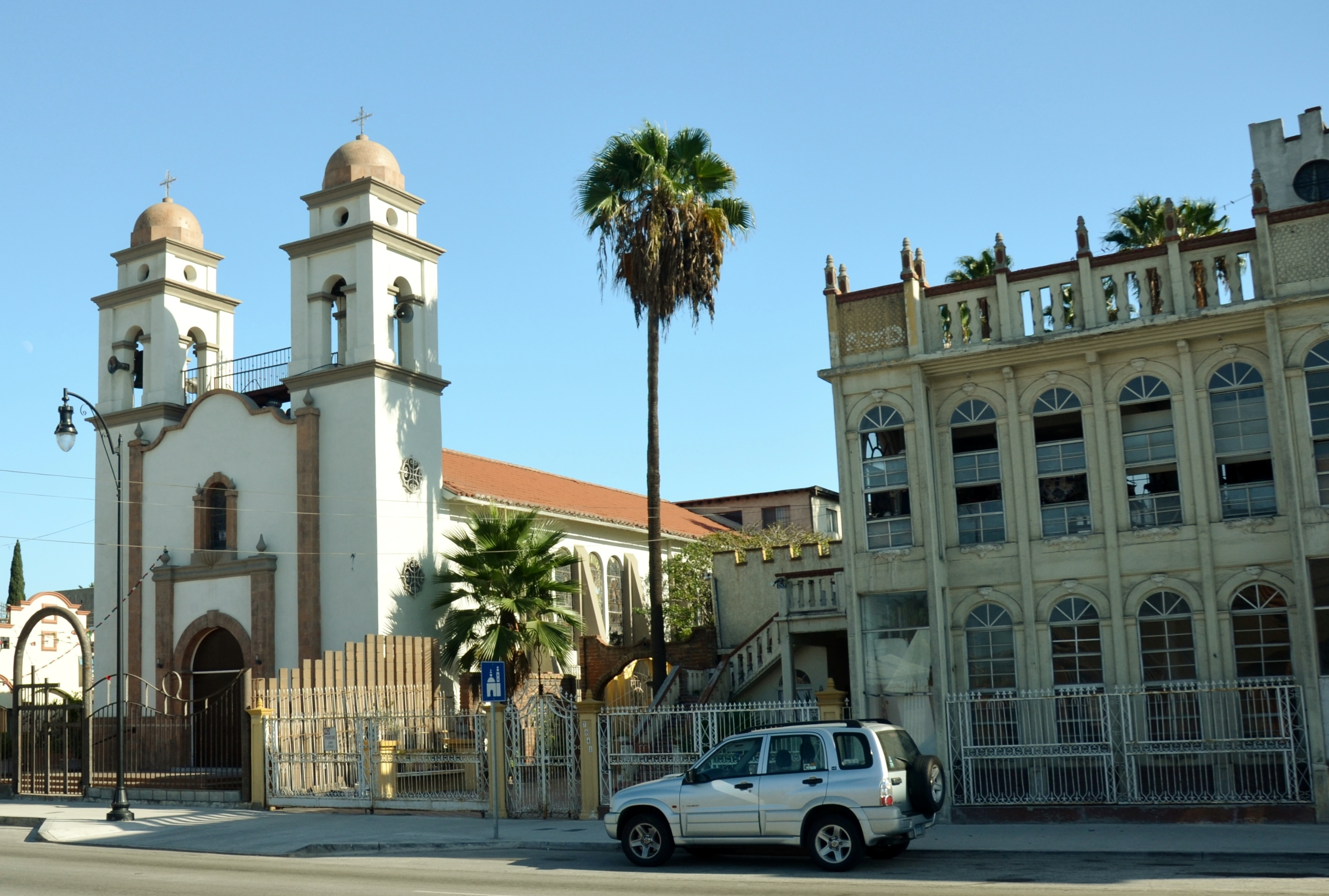
Imaculada Concepción Church

The majority of Tijuana's migrant Mexican population hail from Sinaloa, Michoacán, Jalisco, Oaxaca, and Mexico City. Because of the diversity of Mexico and the influx of immigrants from almost every region in the country, there are no accurate estimates on ethnicity or race of the current population. The heavy influx of immigrants to the city and municipality of Tijuana has led to job creation in the form of over 700 twin-plant (maquiladora) factories, which serve as the basis of employment for the majority of the working-class people in northern Mexico. The high poverty level in Tijuana is attributed to the city's "magnet status" for people who have come from the poorer south of the nation and citizens from other nations seeking to escape from extreme poverty. Tijuana holds a status that provides the possibility of employment as well as higher education and the dream of crossing the border. Tijuana and Baja California in general have much stronger economies and higher incomes than other Mexican cities along the United States border, as well as more moderate weather.

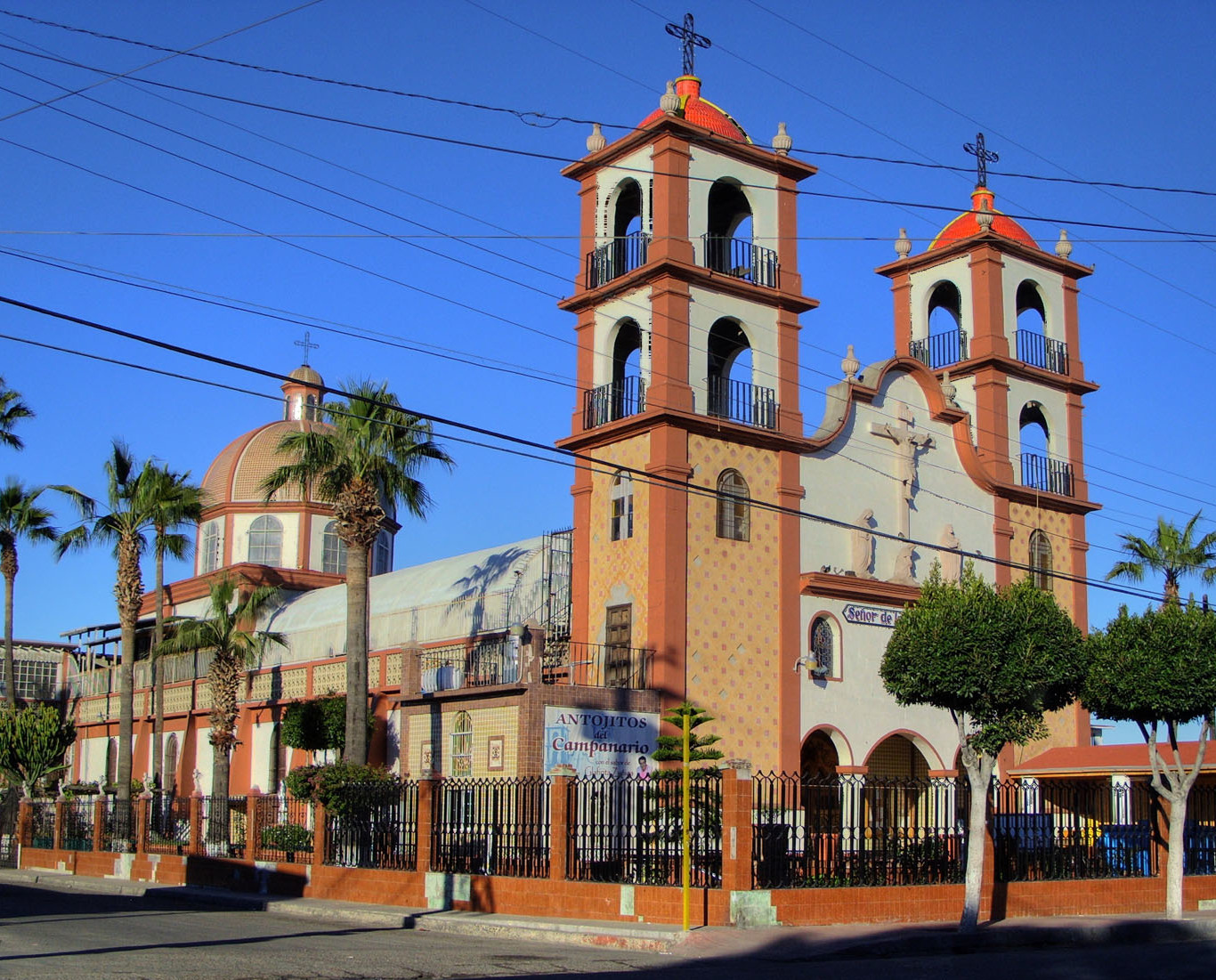
Señor de Misericordia Church

Tijuana today is one of the fastest-growing cities in Mexico, with an average of 80,000 people moving to Tijuana yearly. In terms of area, the city grows by approximately three hectares a day though mostly east and south as the city is mostly built out to the beach already with the exception of some canyons. Along with settlements separated from Tijuana proper and other communities unimproved land, big business moves in providing supermarkets and retail to marginal areas, along with paved roads. The city experiences the construction of 26,000 new settlers a year that has led to the illegal squatter homes that takes place in the hills and valleys of ever expanding Tijuana, most of these areas are still without city services like sidewalks, paving, streetlights, and public transit. This is an ongoing process: as older and existing squatter areas are brought into the city services, more marginal areas become occupied by squatters.

National Population Council (CONAPO) data has estimated that by 2030, growth rates maintaining, the city will become the second-largest in Mexico and anchor to the fourth largest metropolitan area in Mexico. The suburban sprawl observed in Tijuana leaves the downtown and beach areas relatively affluent.

While the INEGI Census 2010 placed Tijuana's population at 1.3 million, only two percent more than in 2005 Census, Tijuana City Council estimates from 2010 place the population closer to two million, at 1.6 million.

As of 2005 the large majority of the city's population, 96%, adhere to the beliefs of Christianity. The denominations are further divided into followers of Catholicism – 61% – and of Protestantism – 35%. While other beliefs occupying a 4% margin in the city include Taoism (among other Asian and European religions), atheism and agnosticism is also found.

=== Crime ===
Tijuana is the birthplace and base of the Tijuana Cartel. From 2007 through 2010, Tijuana experienced a high level of violent crime related to gang violence, in part derived from the Mexican drug war and human trafficking. Homicides peaked in 2010, when 844 people were killed, compared with 355 in 2004 and 349 in the first eight months of 2011. Reportedly, the wave of violence resulted from a turf war as the administration of President Felipe Calderón weakened the local Arellano Félix cartel; violence slowed when the larger Sinaloa cartel took control.

During the peak years of violent crime in the city, gun battles between rival cartels, and between cartels and the police, erupted in public. In April 2008, police found 1,500 shell casings on various streets after one battle left 13 suspected drug traffickers dead. In 2009 and depending on the source, Tijuana Municipality experienced either 556 or 1,118 murders, mostly as a result of the drug war.

There were 492 murders in 2013, a 48% increase in the homicide rate between 2012 and 2013. This was the highest number of murders since 2010. By the end of 2017, the number of murders in Tijuana increased to 1,744, which was almost double those in 2016.

In 2018, OECD data recorded 2,253 homicides in Tijuana, equivalent to 129.8 per 100,000 inhabitants.

In May 2022, Statista data reported Tijuana as having the second highest homicide rate in the world at 138 per 100,000 inhabitants.

== Government ==
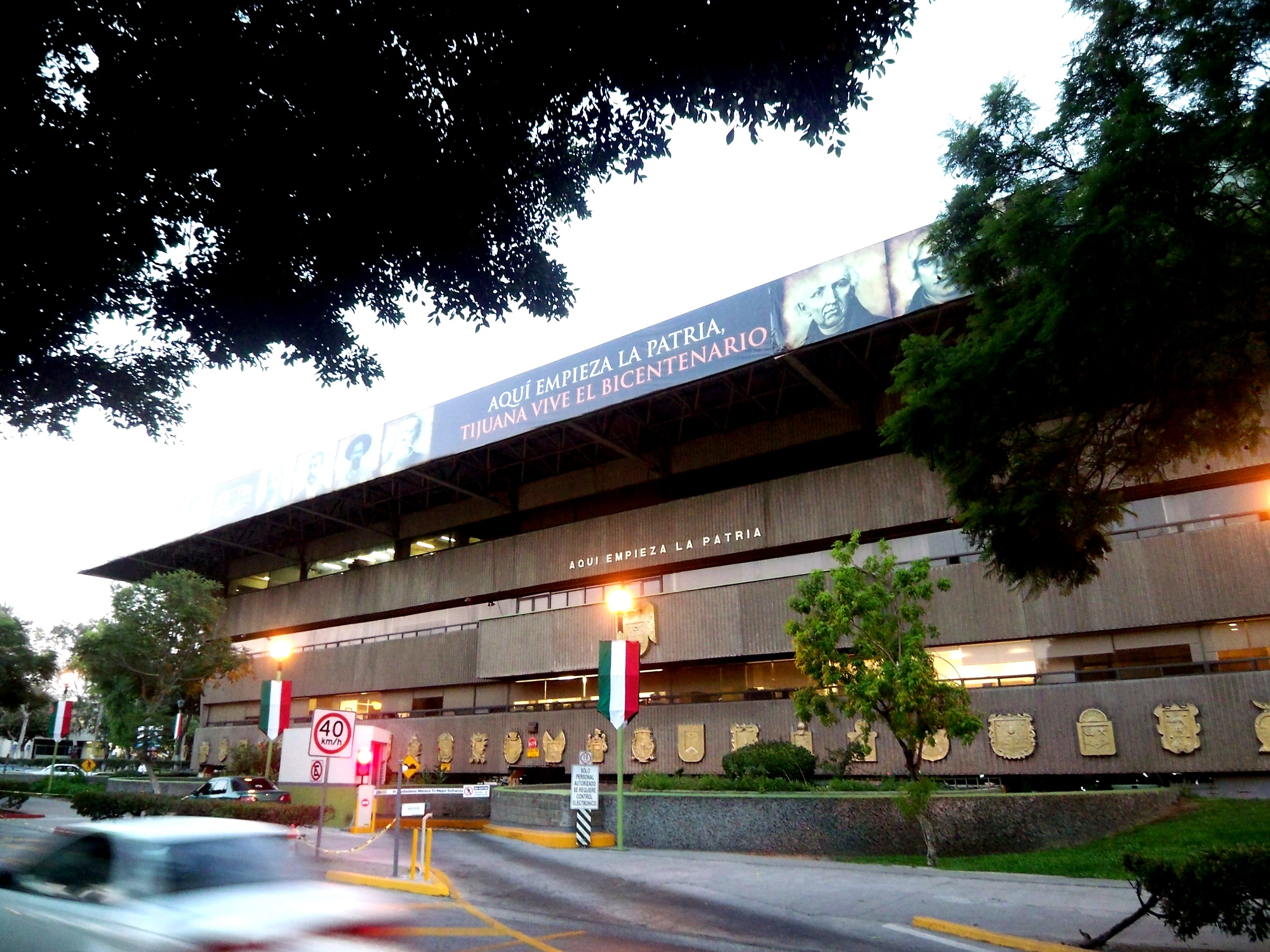
The Palace of Government of Tijuana Municipality

At present, the parties with the greatest presence in Tijuana are the National Action Party (PAN), Institutional Revolutionary Party (PRI), and Ecologist Green Party of Mexico (PVEM). The PAN has been the dominant party in the city for 20 years. Historically the PRI had been the dominant party in regional politics, until 1989 when the PAN began to dominate the city, until yet again, in 2004, PRI began regaining prominence and won the Mayor's Office.

Less prominent parties also maintain relations with the dominant parties. These other parties, with less presence include the New Alliance Party (PANAL), Social Encounter Party (PES), and Party of the Democratic Revolution (PRD). Allied with the PAN at the state and local level under the Alliance for Baja California are the Social Encounter Party (PES) and New Alliance Party (PANAL). Allied with the PRI at the state and local level under the "Alliance for Better Living" are the Ecologist Green Party of Mexico (PVEM) and Baja California State Party (PEBC).

Tijuana's importance and rise to a global city has led to its recognition among countries worldwide. In addition to international cultural recognition, Tijuana has received political recognition and is a developing a political center currently host to eight consulates from European, Asian and North American countries.

== Economy ==
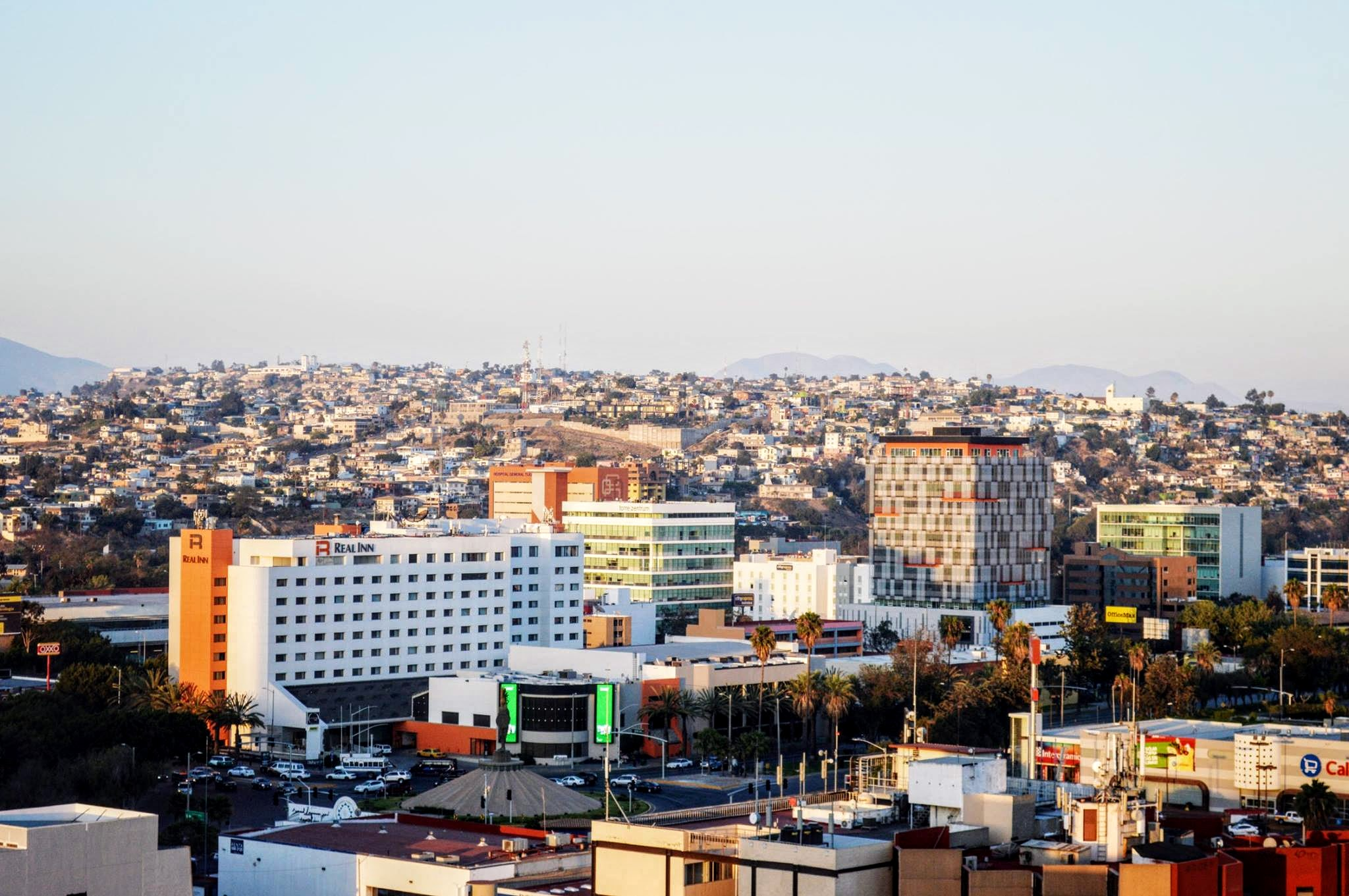
View of the Zona Río, Tijuana's central business district

Tijuana is the economic center of Baja California and an important center for international trade in The Californias. The city is one of North America's most prominent manufacturing centers, as well as a major tourist destination.

Plaza Rio Tijuana is a large regional mall anchored by Cinépolis, Sanborns, Súper DAX and Sears. An important concentration of commercial plazas is in the Cinco y Diez around an eponymous intersection, named for a former American-style five and dime store that was located there. It is also a major hub for public transit. Plaza Carrousel, with its namesake merry-go-round, is located here.

Tijuana, along with the nearby Valle de Guadalupe, has recently become a culinary hotspot due to its Baja Med cuisine, including chefs such as Javier Plascencia, but also for its tacos, other street food, food trucks, coffee houses and artisanal beer.

Tijuana receives 2.5 million medical tourists per year.

=== Tourism ===
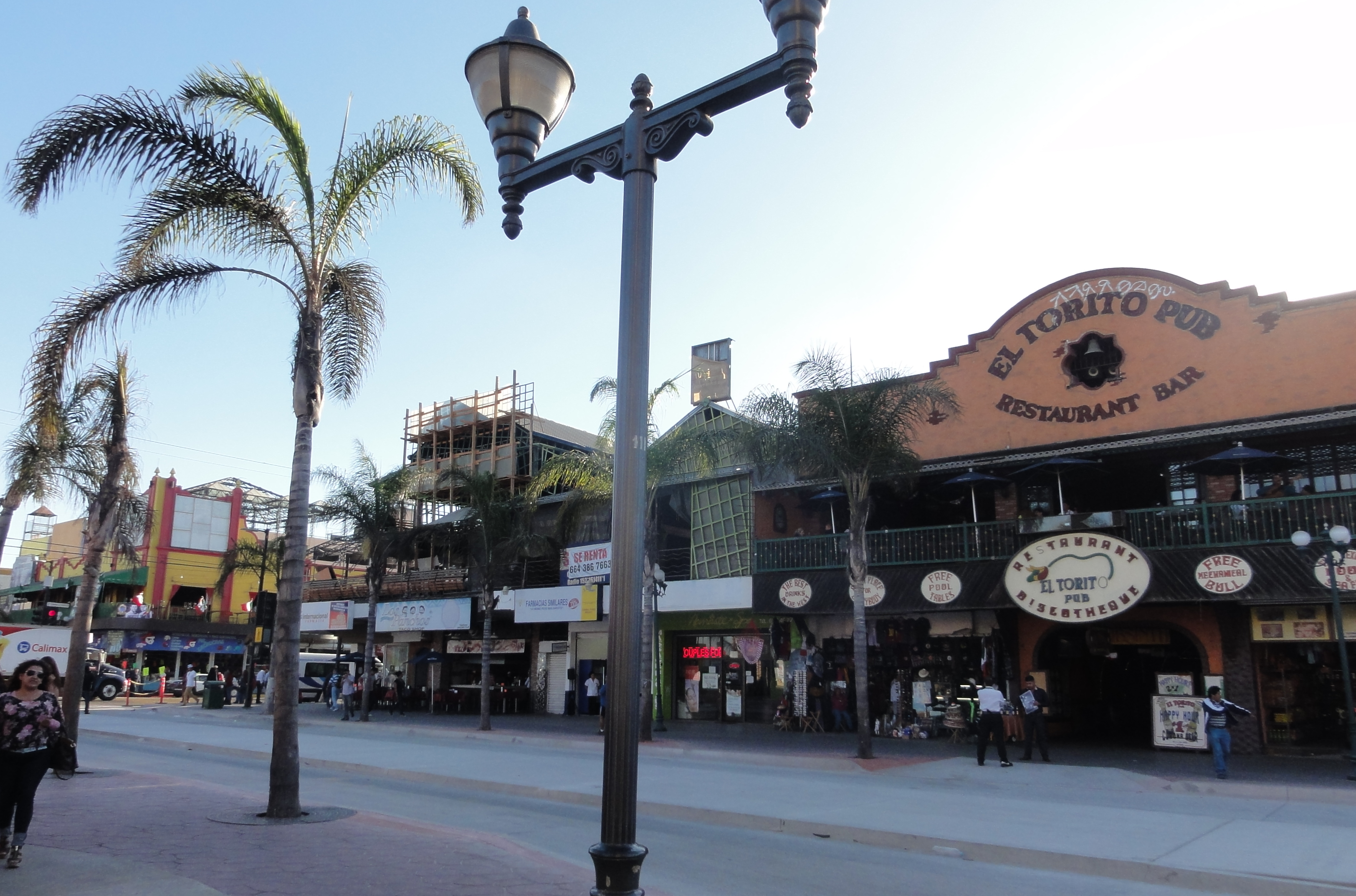
Restaurants on Avenida Revolución

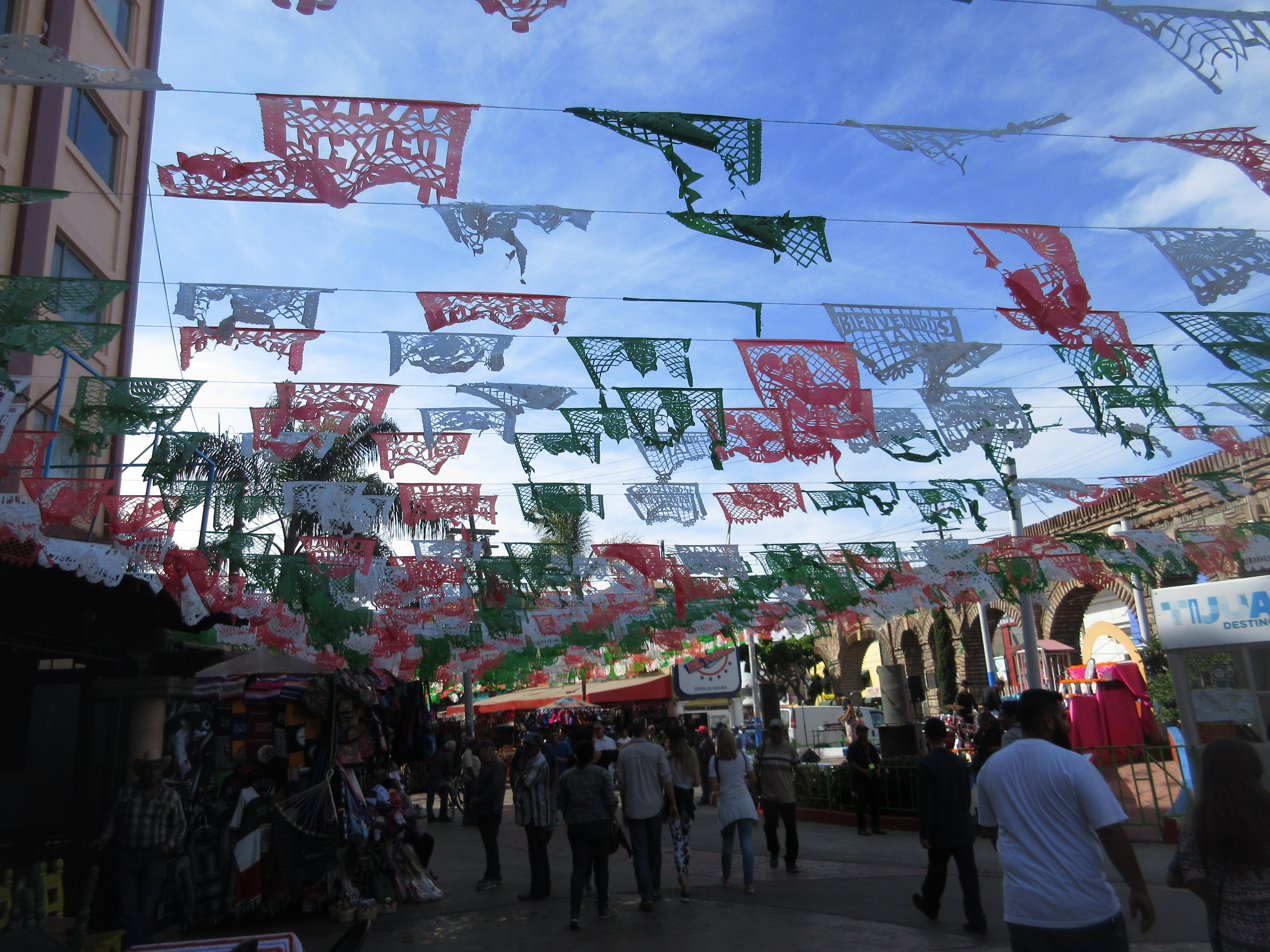
Plaza Santa Cecília decorated with traditional Mexican papel picado

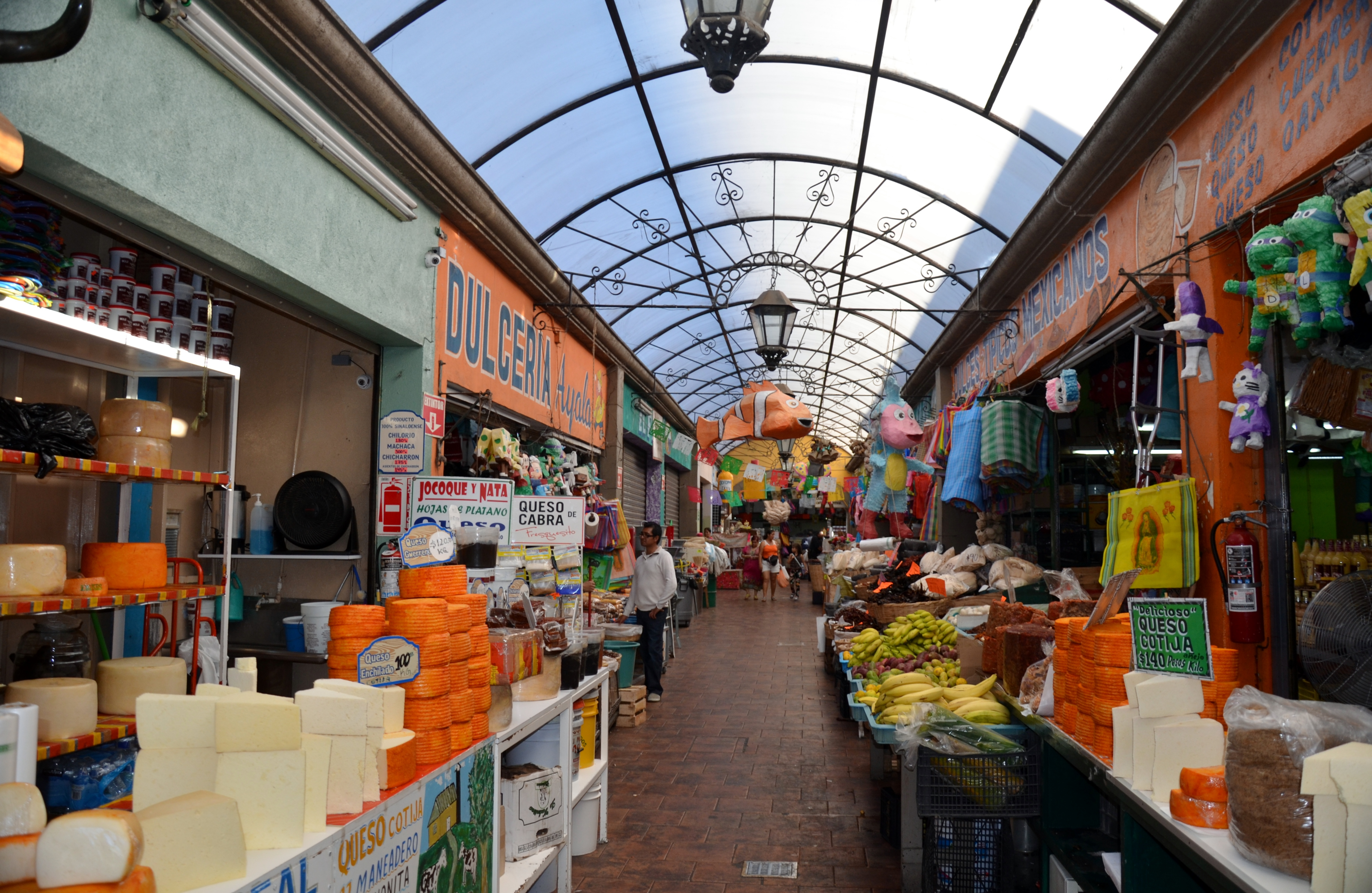
Market in Zona Centro

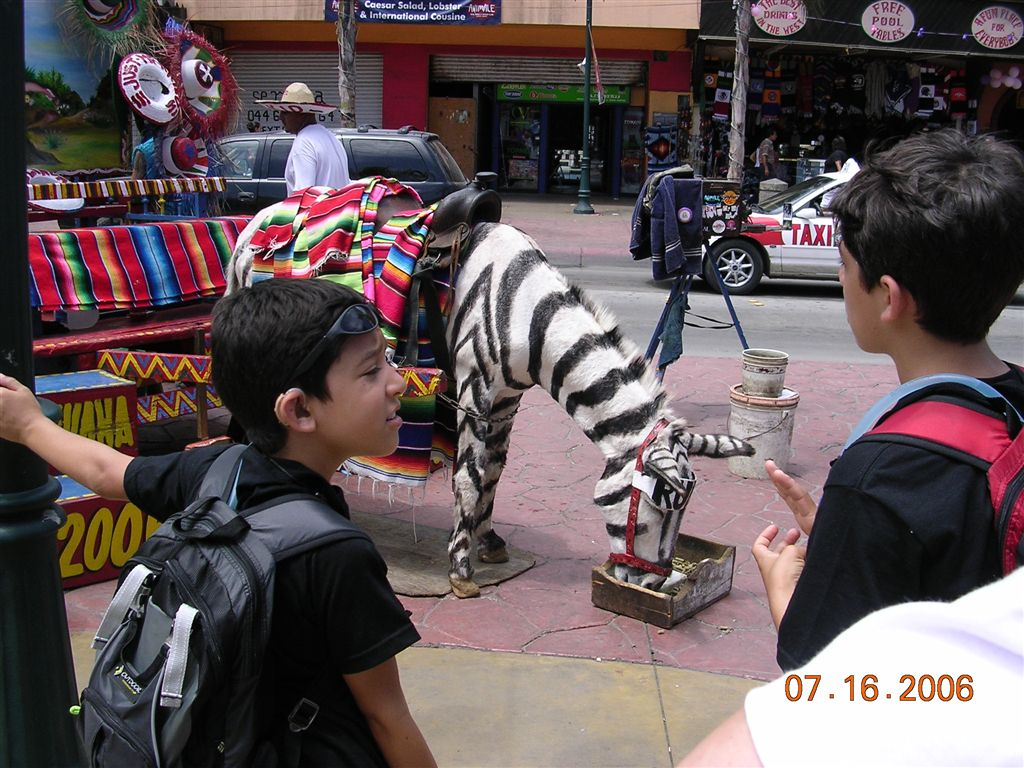
A Tijuana zonkey

Tijuana also relies on tourism for a major part of its revenue. About 300,000 visitors cross by foot or car from the San Ysidro point of entry in the United States every day. Restaurants and taco stands, pharmacies, bars and dance clubs, and shops and stalls selling Mexican crafts and souvenirs are part of the draw for the city's tourists, many located within walking distance of the border. The city's tourist centers include Downtown Tijuana including the nightlife hot spots around La Sexta, Avenida Revolución, souvenir shopping at the Mercado de Artesanías and Plaza Viva Tijuana, Tijuana's Cultural Center (CECUT) and neighboring Plaza Río Tijuana shopping center, and the city's best known vices, in the form of its legal Red Light District and gambling (Agua Caliente). Tijuana is also known for being the birthplace of the Caesar salad. Mexico's drinking age of 18 (vs. 21 in the United States) makes it a common weekend destination for many high school and college aged Southern Californians who tend to stay on Avenida Revolución.

Tijuana is also known for its red-light district Zona Norte (also referred to as La Coahuila after one of its main streets) with legal prostitution in strip clubs and on the street. The strip clubs are typically full-contact, meaning the dancers let patrons fondle them. Many dancers also sell their sexual services. In a 1999 estimation, there were 15,000 women engaged in prostitution in Tijuana outside of clubs and brothels.

Tijuana has many pharmacies that target visitors from the United States, which sell some medicines without prescriptions and/or at much lower costs than in the U.S. Many medications still require a Mexican prescription, which can be obtained from adjacent doctors' offices. People filling up prescriptions for drugs classified in the US as Schedule II or Schedule III have found it more difficult to locate such medications, and the purchase of pseudoephedrine also has become restricted by Tijuana pharmacies, just as in the U.S. To fill a prescription in Tijuana for any drug covered by the US Controlled Substances Act and legally bring it into the United States requires a prescription from the United States for re-import. Americans can import up to a 90-day supply of non-controlled medications for personal use to the US from Mexico and other countries.

Businesses such as auto detailing, medical and dental services and plastic surgery are heavily marketed, and are usually much less expensive than in the U.S.

Tijuana is headquarters for Mexico's largest gambling concern, Grupo Caliente, which operates the only casinos in the city, more than twenty branches.

Tourists are sometimes robbed by municipal police.

=== Manufacturing ===
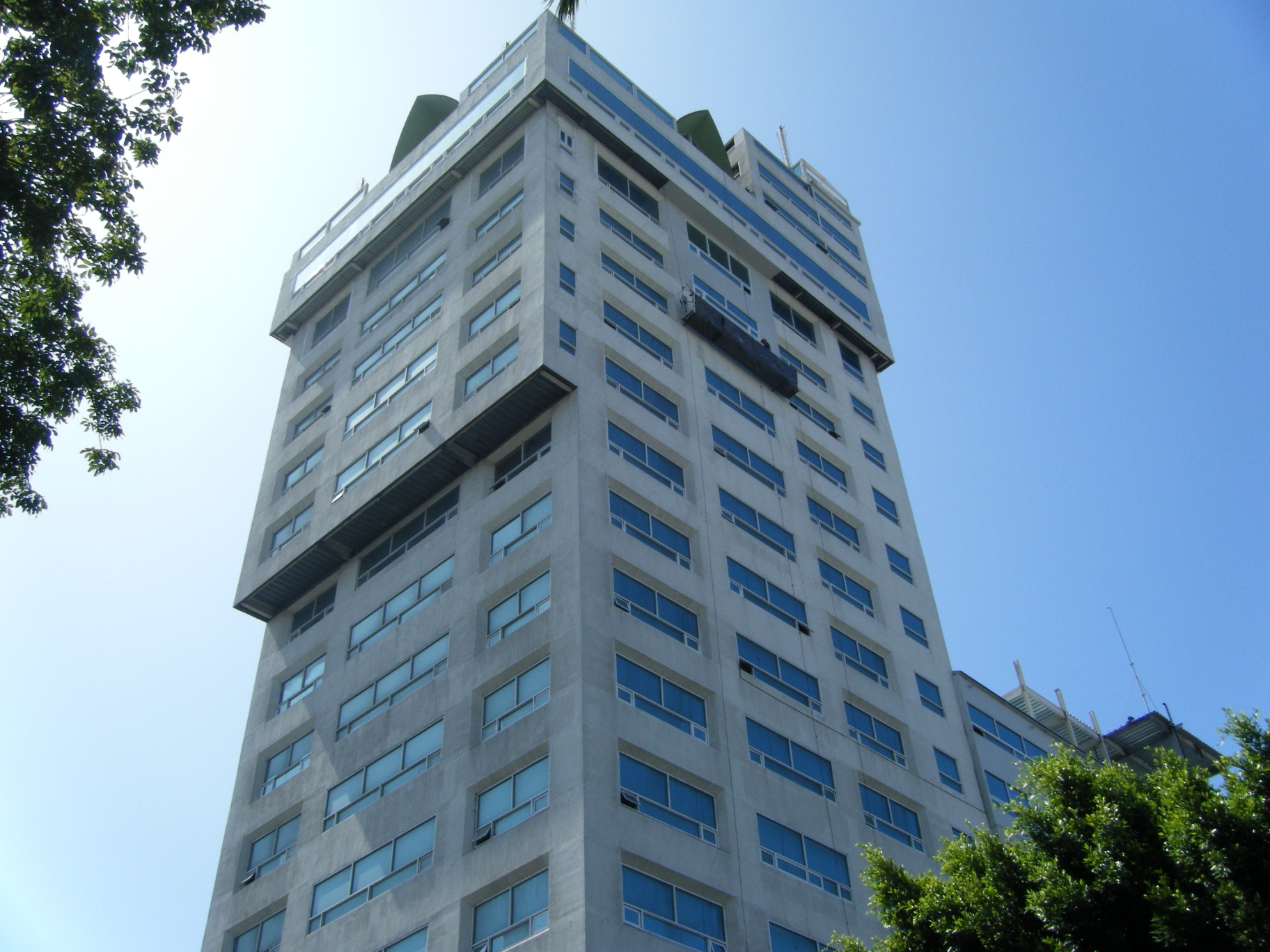
Excel Medical Center. Tijuana is a leader in the manufacturing of medical devices.

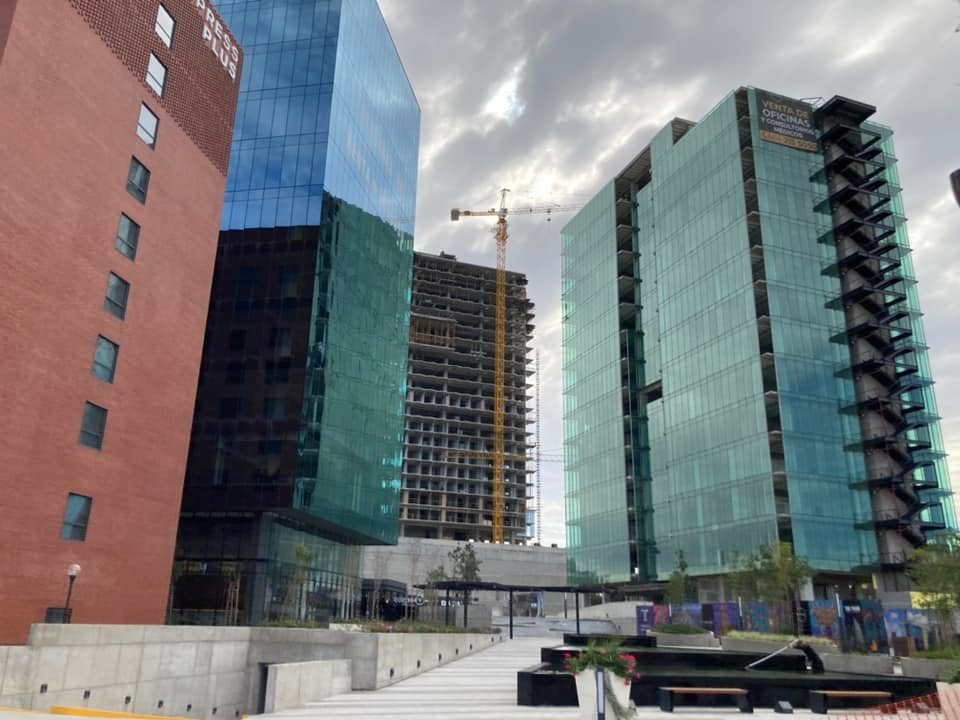
Tijuana has grown in the 21st century as a significant commercial and manufacturing center of North America.

Tijuana is a large manufacturing center, and in addition to tourism, it serves as a cornerstone of the city economy. In the past decade alone, Tijuana became the medical device manufacture capital of the North American continent, surpassing previous leader Minneapolis–Saint Paul. Recently Scantibodies announced a new plant of 130,000 m^{2} devoted to manufacturing of medical devices The new plant is a build to suit by FINSA

Tijuana's proximity to Southern California, and the city's large, skilled, diverse, and relatively inexpensive workforce, make it an attractive city for foreign companies looking to establish extensive industrial parks composed of assembly plants that are called maquiladoras, even more so than other cities in the US-Mexican border zone, taking advantage of the North American Free Trade Agreement (NAFTA) to export products. At its peak, in 2001 Tijuana had roughly 820 of these 'maquiladoras'. Foreign and domestic companies employ thousands of employees in these plants, usually in assembly-related labor. Such jobs are not demanding but typically offer above average salaries for Mexico, with most maqiladoras jobs beginning at MX$100 per day (about 5 US dollars, as of September 2016), significantly above the Mexican minimum wage of Mex$57.46 (about 3 US dollars, as of September 2016). Companies that have set up maquiladoras in Tijuana include Medtronic, Lanix, Hyundai, Sony, Vortec, BMW, Vizio, Toyota, Dell, Samsung, Kodak, Matsushita/Panasonic, GE, Nabisco, Ford, Microsoft, Cemex, Zonda, Philips, Pioneer, Airbus, Plantronics, Siemens Mexico, Jaguar, Sanyo and Volkswagen. Many of the maquiladoras are located in the Otay Mesa and Florido sections of Tijuana. Economic development has its central business district at Zona Río, which together, with the corridor along Blvd. Agua Caliente (the extension of Avenida Revolución), contains the majority of the higher-end office space in the city.

== Education ==
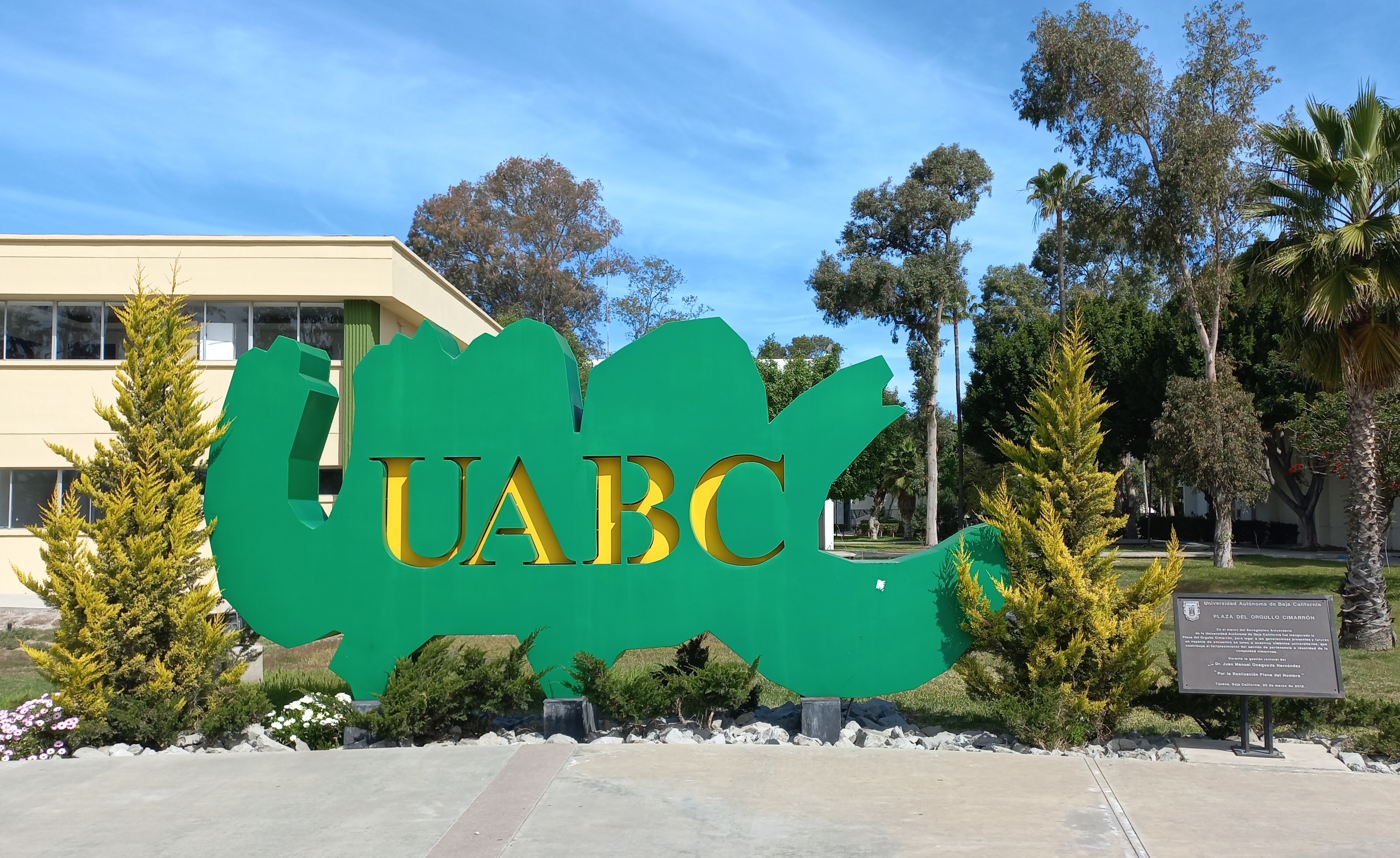
Autonomous University of Baja California, Tijuana (UABC)

Tijuana is home to many private Primary Schools, Secondary Schools and High Schools as well as nationally high-ranked colleges and universities.

The Instituto México is a notable secondary school.

Higher education
Universities in Tijuana include:

- Autonomous University of Baja California, Tijuana
- Ibero-American University
- Xochicalco University
- Cetys Universidad, Tijuana
- Tijuana Institute of Technology
- UNIVERSITAM Technology University

== Culture ==
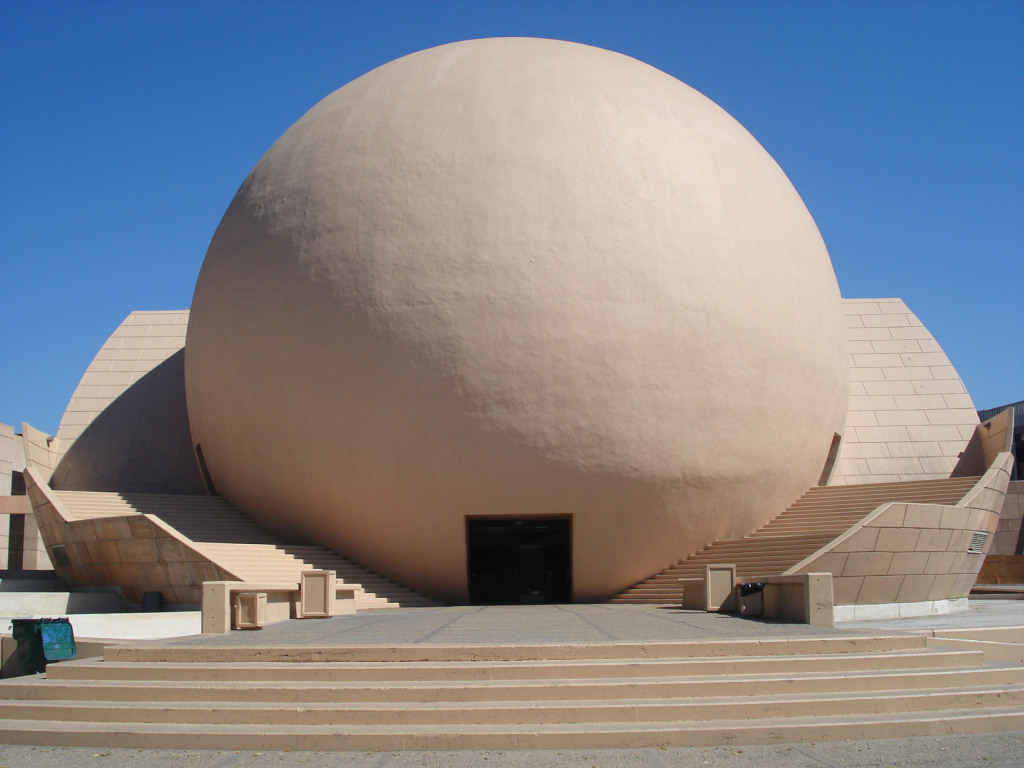
Tijuana Cultural Center is an arts center and home to the Museum of The Californias.

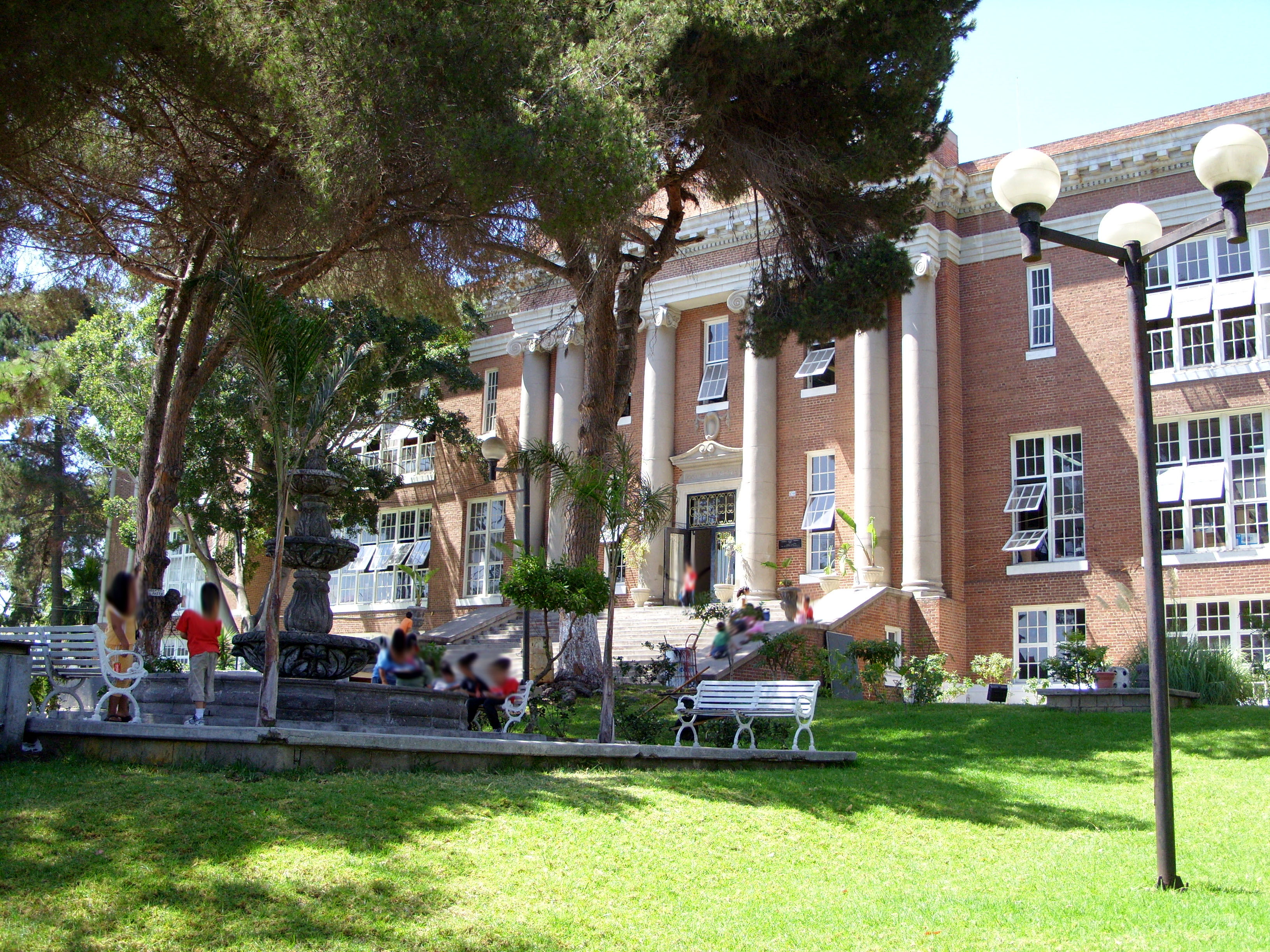
Casa de la Cultura de Tijuana

Many foreigners travel to Tijuana to drink and dance, buy prescription drugs, purchase bootleg brand-name clothing, timepieces, and other personal accessories found globally, as well as manufactured and hand-crafted local curiosities. Locals and regular tourists avoid hassles by visiting the clubs at Plaza Fiesta or other areas of the Zona Río without the crowds, heavy marketing, and occasional tourist misbehavior or outright lawbreaking common on the Revolución strip.

Parque Morelos has a small zoo and park space; Parque de la Amistad in Otay Centenario has a small pond, and a running and dirt-bike track. Parque Teniente Guerrero is a downtown park with a public library and weekend entertainment by clowns.

=== Entertainment ===
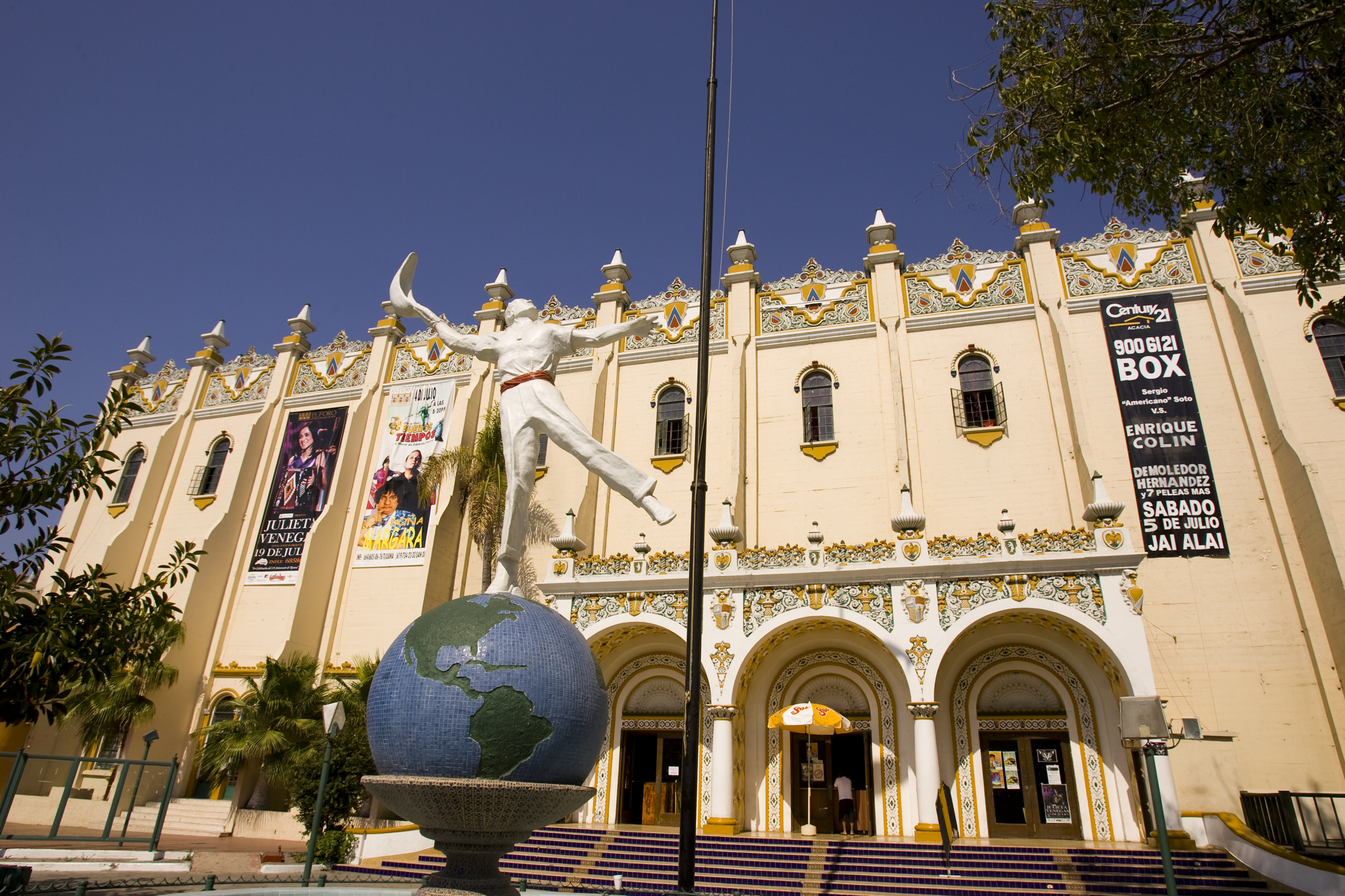
The Jai Alai arena, built in 1947, attracted spectators from both sides of the border.

As Tijuana matured from a tourist-oriented border town into one of Mexico's largest cities, the 1982 opening of the Tijuana Cultural Center (CECUT) marked a milestone. CECUT's mission was to strengthening Tijuana's image, both to US visitors and to Mexicans, as a destination for culture and not only shopping and vice. The center includes an OMNIMAX cinema showing IMAX films, the Museum of the Californias, contemporary art exhibition halls, a restaurant, café, bookstore, and other cultural facilities.

La Casa de la Cultura cultural center comprises a school, a theater, and a public library, and teaches dance, painting, music, plastic arts, photography and languages.

Other cultural venues include the Instituto Municipal de Arte y Cultura (Municipal Institute of Art and Culture), the Tijuana Wax Museum, the Museo El Trompo (Trompo Museum), and El Foro, the former Jai Alai Palace, that is now a concert venue. Concerts are also held at the Estadio Caliente stadium, Hipódromo Agua Caliente Racetrack, and at the "Audiorama" at the Museo El Trompo children's museum of science and technology.

The Tijuana Country Club (Club Campestre de Tijuana) has many affluent members and a famous golf course and also functions as an entertainment and events venue. Tijuana also has a large Rotary Club.

Nightlife

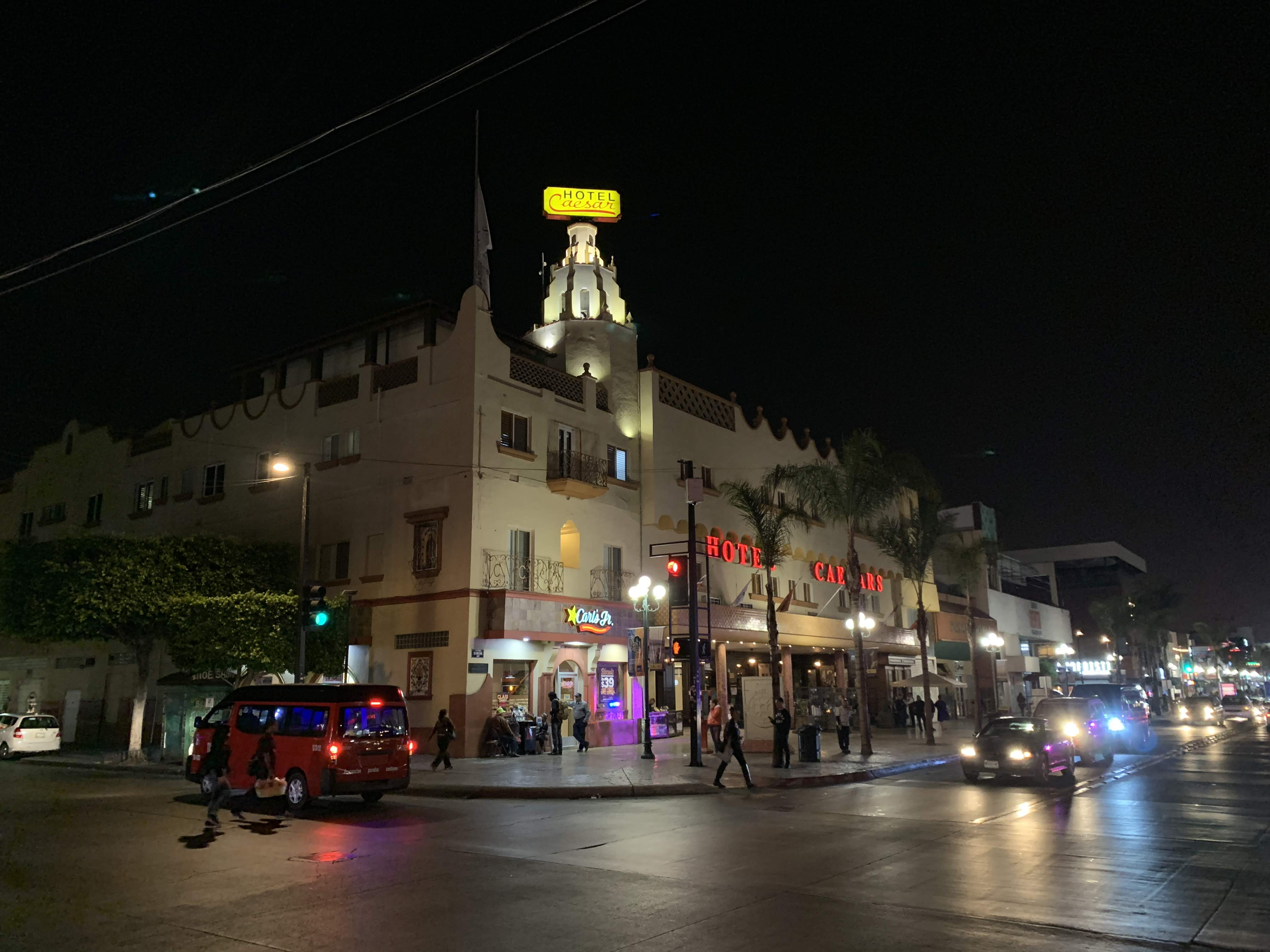
Caesar salad was invented at Caesar's in the 1920s.

Avenida Revolución has been known for its proliferation of nightclub shows, primarily catering to tourists.

Tijuana's nightlife scene is one of the city's strongest attractions. The area surrounding "La Sexta", the intersection at Calle Sexta and Av. Revolución, is now a major hub of new bars and dance clubs. Zona Rio, Tijuana's new Downtown, is home to some of the city's finest restaurants and bars. Another capstone of Tijuana's entertainment offerings is its adult nightlife industry, which includes the city's red light district as well as less conspicuous adult entertainment venues.

=== Art ===
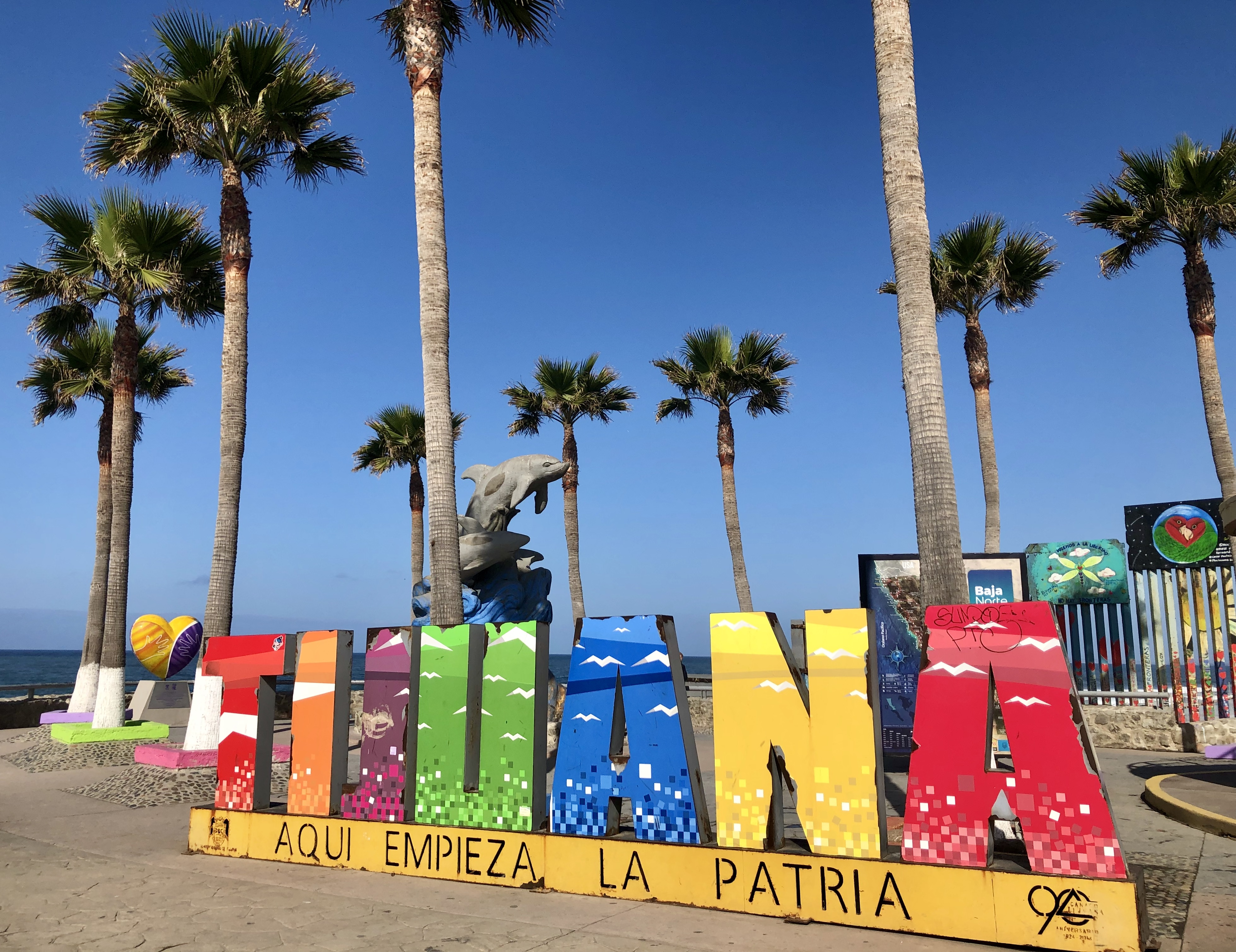
Sculptures at Playas de Tijuana

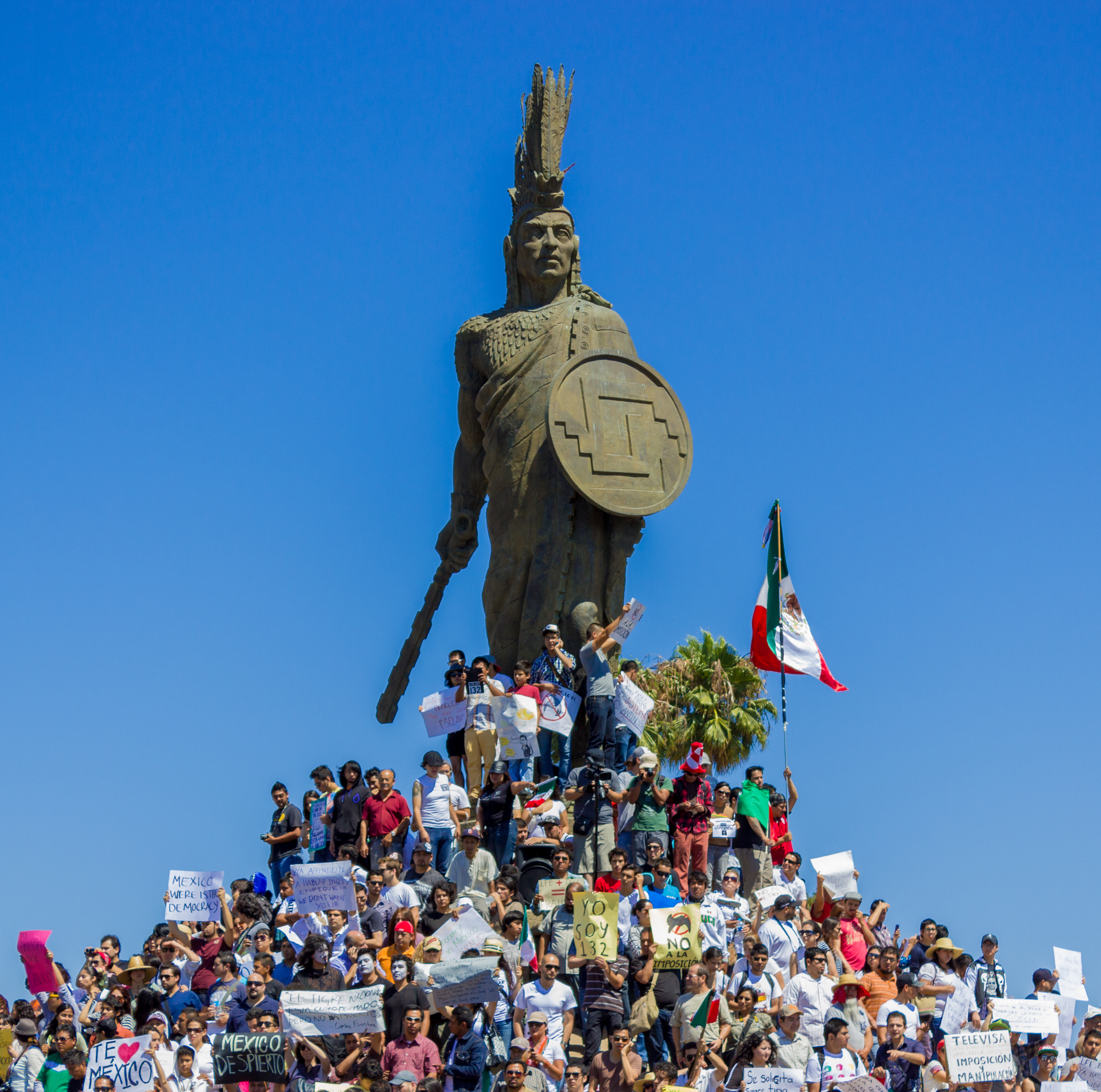
Monument to Cuauhtémoc

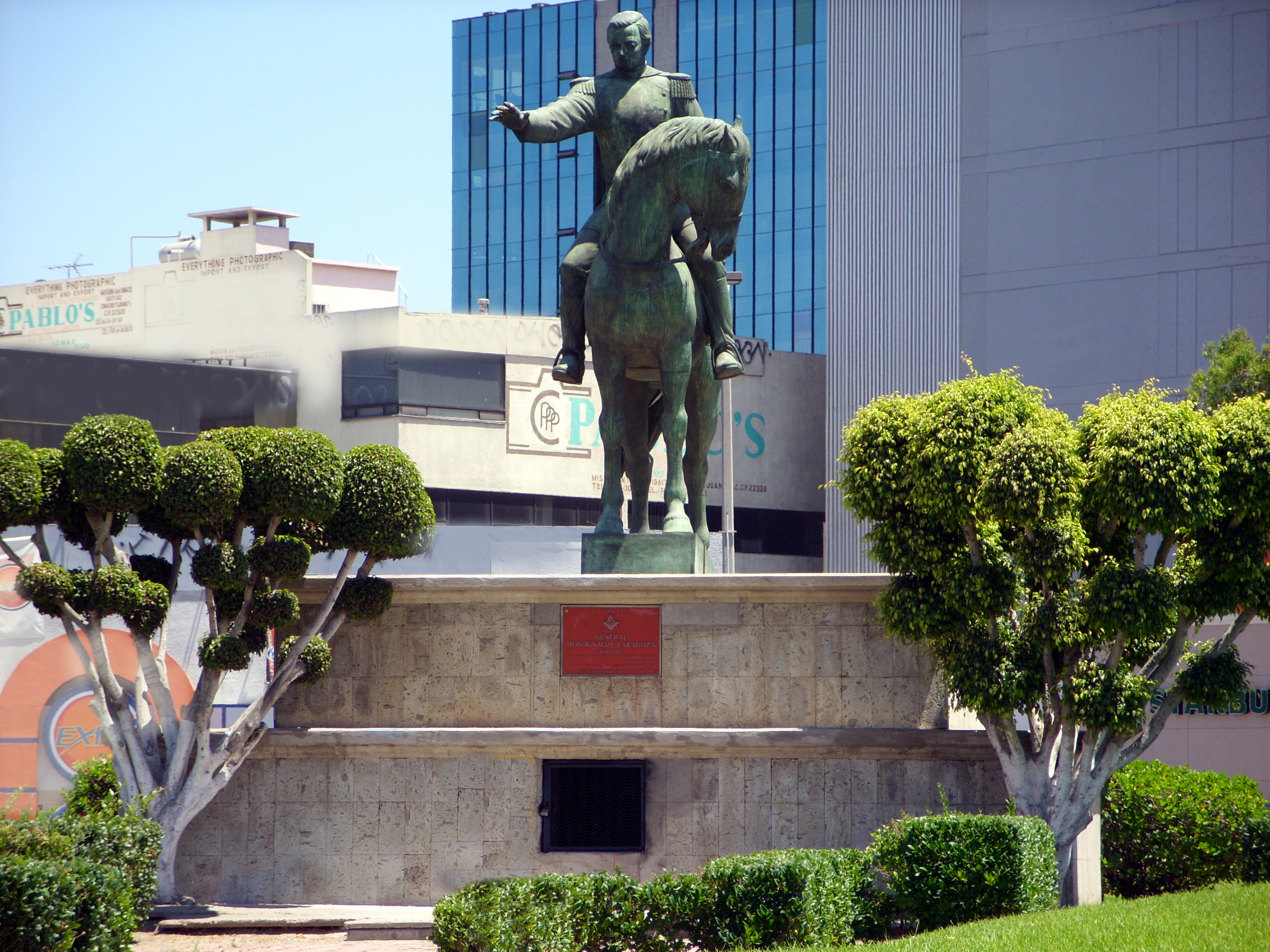
Monument to Ignacio Zaragoza

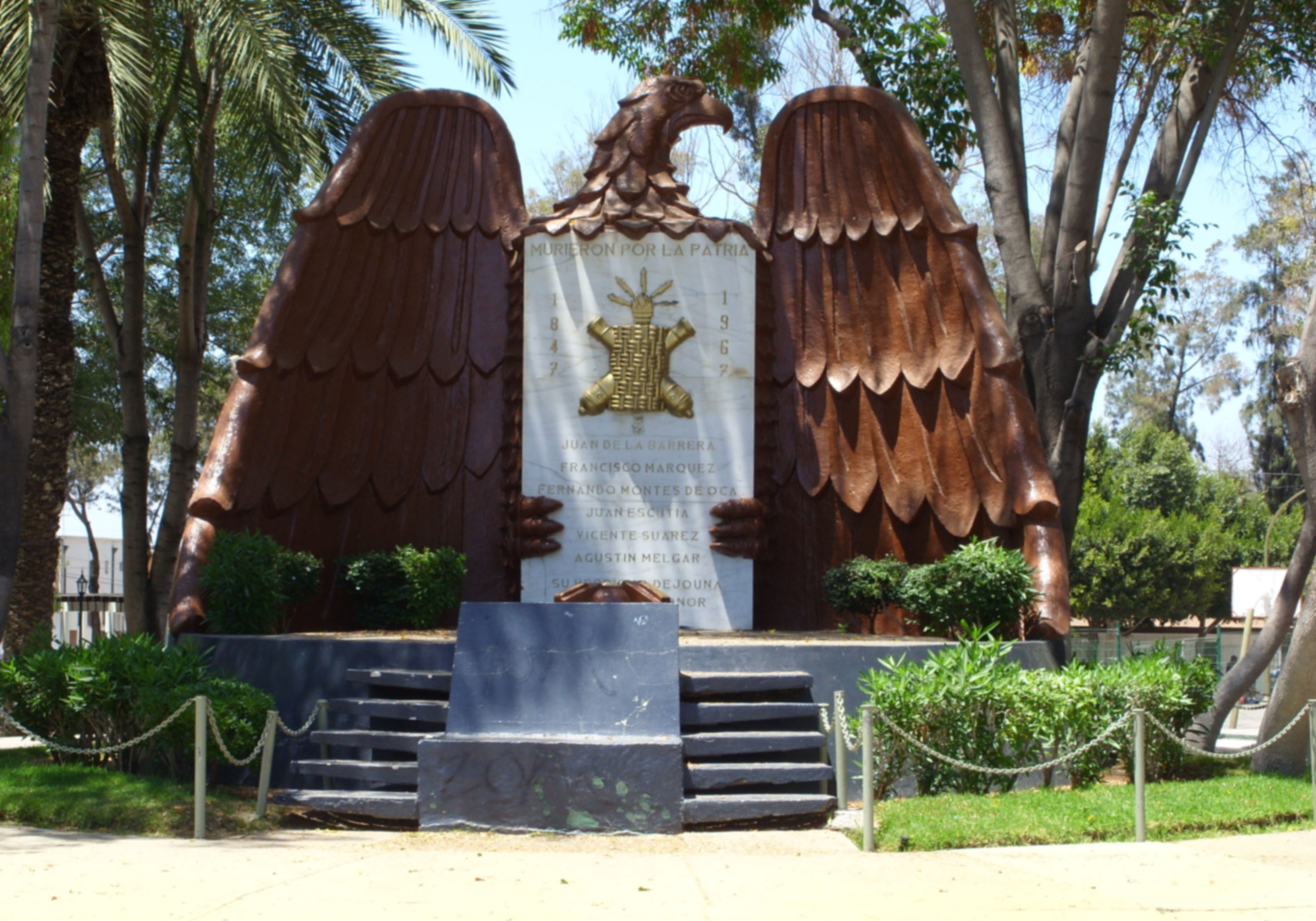
The 18 de Marzo Memorial

Tijuana also has an active and independent artist community whose internationally recognized work has earned Tijuana the title of "one of the most important new cultural meccas", according to Newsweek, an exhibition of Tijuana's current art scene, is being curated by the Museum of Contemporary Art San Diego and is traveling across the US in 2006 and 2007. Art collectives like Bulbo and film production like Palenque Filmaciones explore the use of film like the award-winning Tijuana Makes Me Happy, media like television bulbo TV and print "bulbo PRESS", to show different realities of Tijuana out of Mexico. In 2004, Tijuana earned international acclaim for an art exhibition displayed on the cement banks of the Tijuana River and along the Mexico/U.S. border fence in Otay Mesa.

Graffiti is widespread in Tijuana. They can range from free-hand writing in spray can and marker form, often carrying social or sexual commentary in English or Spanish, pictures in wheatpaste and stencils, consisting of stenciled renderings of personalities crucial to Hispanic culture from past and present eras, such as television news announcers or stars, but also extending to images of artists like Salvador Dalí. Graffiti in Tijuana may seem at first to consist largely of simplistic tags and thus not as technically evolved, colorful, or accepted in the mainstream as the "pieces" of graffiti scenes of the United States, Europe, or Japan, but large, colorful graffiti murals adorn walls from both native Tijuanan artists as well as visiting graffiti writers, especially from California. The Tijuanan art pieces show as much prowess and skill as those made by their more renowned U.S. counterparts, although illicit graffiti are strongly discouraged by the Tijuana government, as in other major metropolitan areas.

=== Music ===
Since the decade of the 1920s, Tijuana has excelled in the musical field, thanks to the first groups of ranchera music that began to set the tourist establishments in the area with the visit of foreigners, including the former Casino Agua Caliente.

Javier Batiz founded in 1957 he founded a group called "Los TJ's" with which he collected musical influences that were received in the Mexican border cities of black music, blues and R&B from people like T-Bone Walker, Muddy Waters, B.B. King, Chuck Berry, Howlin' Wolf, James Brown, among others. Later he would start his solo career in the rest of the country and participating in some bands in Mexico City.

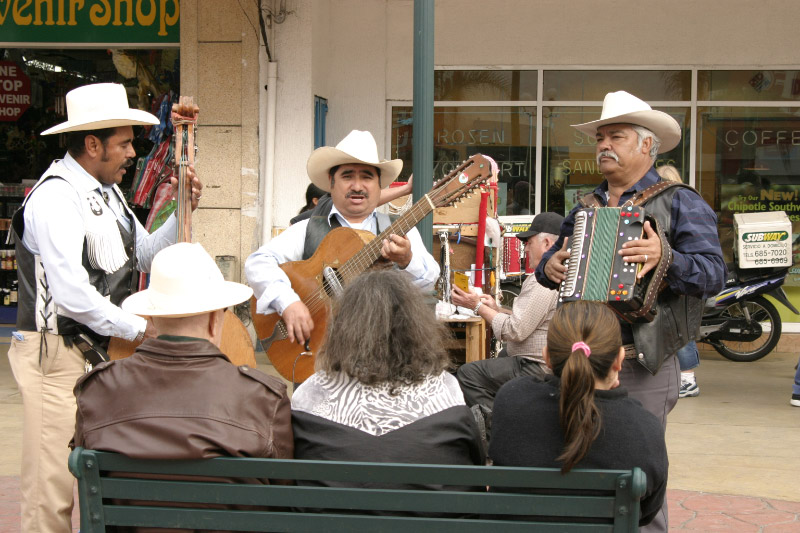
A Norteño musical ensemble performing in Downtown Tijuana

During the 60s, the American trumpeter Herb Alpert, in a visit to the bullfights made in the old Bullfight, found musical inspiration so after the recording of his single "The Lonely Bull", which was a radio hit in 1962. With the success, he decided to make a casting and formed "The Tijuana Brass", with whom he toured and had a presentation on television. It was a musical collaboration with artists from Los Angeles, with style called "Tijuana Marimba´s Brass". The band was dissolved in 1969 but they continued with some presentations under the name of T.J.B. 55

Despite the downturn in rock artists for some years, in the 90s Tijuana No! emerged, returning a bit of the genre to the city. They also incorporated ska, punk and reggae. "No" would be the first album released, from which successes like "Pobre de ti", which had Julieta Venegas as a vocalist, would emerge. Later the singer began her solo career already in the 00s of the 21st century. Her musical career reached the recording of six studio albums, and she won two Grammys, six Latin Grammys, six MTV Latin America and two Latin Music Billboard.

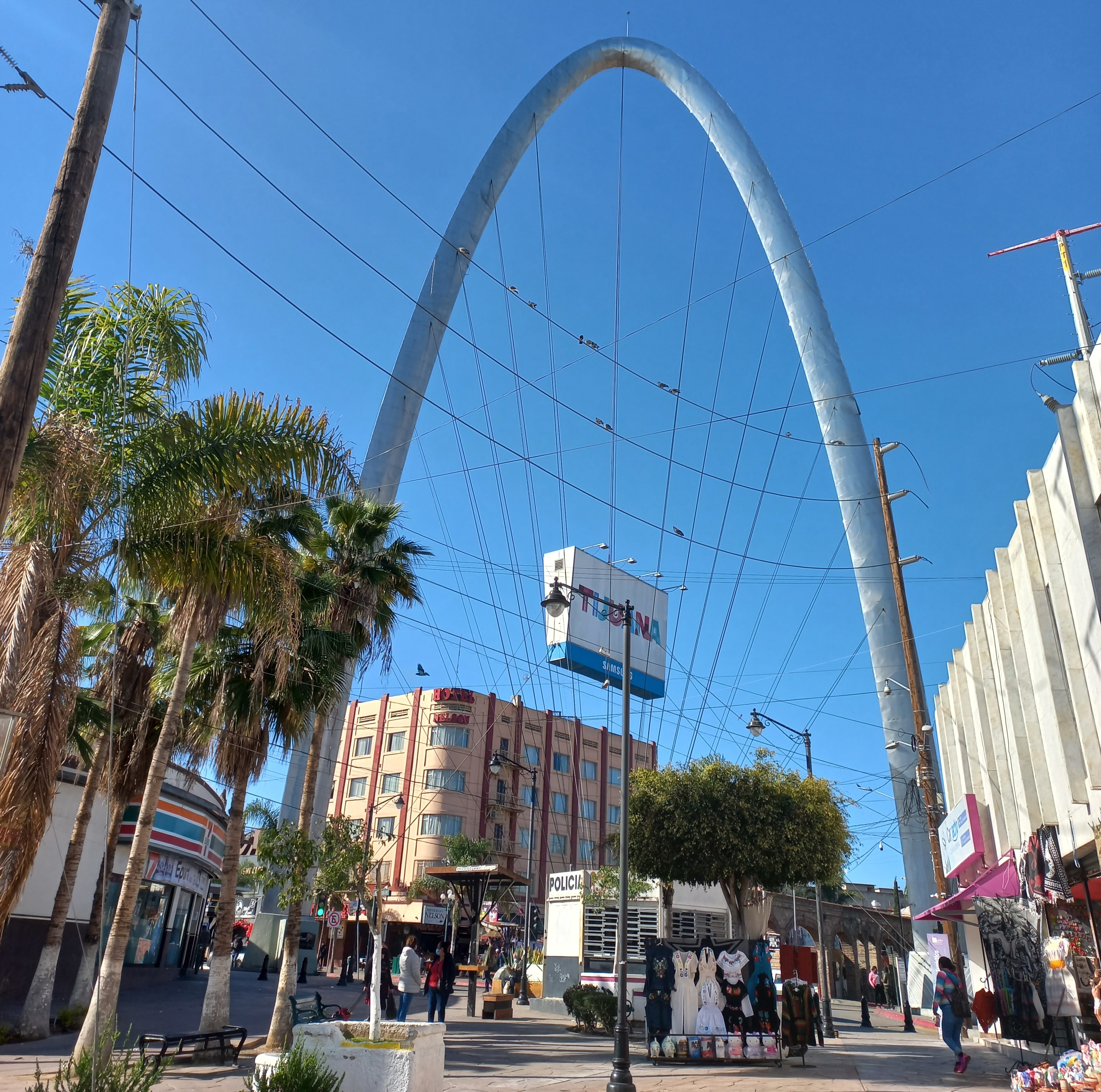
The Tijuana Arch, in Zona Centro

Among other things, Tijuana has been the inspiration for the birthplace of Nortec music style and Ruidoson, resulting in a very large and active electronic music scene where groups and artists like Los Macuanos, Maria y Jose, Siberium, Hidhawk and Harpocrates emerged. Tijuana also enjoys a large base of support in many other musical scenes such as mexican hip hop, reggae, hardcore, punk, black metal and house music. Famous musicians are from Tijuana including the pop-rock singer-songwriter Lynda Thomas and Vanessa Zamora and international indie punk bands like Delux and Los Kung-Fu Monkeys.

To promote the cultural development in children and youth of Tijuana, since 1996 the Tijuana Youth Symphony (SJT) has been promoted, which promotes education and musical training through instrument practices, music reading and public concerts. In addition, Tijuana has an opera season. There are also several musical festivals throughout the year, among which the Latin American Guitar Festival, Mainly Mozart Binacional, and the International Exhibition of contemporary dance "Bodies in Transit" stand out.

Tijuana is home to the Baja California Orchestra, one of the most prestigious and solid artistic institutions in northwestern Mexico, which was nominated for the Latin Grammy in the category of best classical album by the Latin Academy of Recording Arts and Sciences Inc., with the album Tango kills Danzón kills Tango. This phonogram was distinguished as 'Best Classical Album of the year 2001' by the Mexican Union of Theater and Music Chroniclers. Currently, it maintains an annual season, offering symphonic and chamber music concerts in the most important forums of Tijuana and Baja California.

== Sports ==
Club	Sport	Founded	League	Venue
Club Tijuana	Association football	2007	Liga MX	Estadio Caliente
Toros de Tijuana	Baseball	2014	Mexican League	Estadio Chevron
Tijuana Zonkeys	Basketball	2010	Circuito de Baloncesto de La Costa Del Pacifico	Auditorio Fausto Gutierrez Moreno
Club Tijuana Femenil	Association Soccer	2016	Liga MX Femenil	Estadio Caliente

The city is home to the Tijuana Zonkeys professional basketball team of the CIBACOPA basketball league. The team is composed mostly of players from Mexico and plays from February to July in the Municipal Auditorium.

The city has a strong tradition of association football, Club Tijuana began playing in the Liga MX México Primera División on the 2011/12 season, winning the 2012 Apertura title. They play their matches at the Estadio Caliente, a new 33,000-seat stadium. The team's mascot is the Xoloitzcuintle, a famous Mexican hairless dog.

Tijuana also has a long history of producing many world champion professional boxers, such as Antonio Margarito and Erik Morales.

During the 2026 FIFA World Cup, the Iranian national football team moved its base camp from Arizona to Tijuana, Mexico, after several of its staff members were denied entry visas by the United States.

=== Stadiums ===
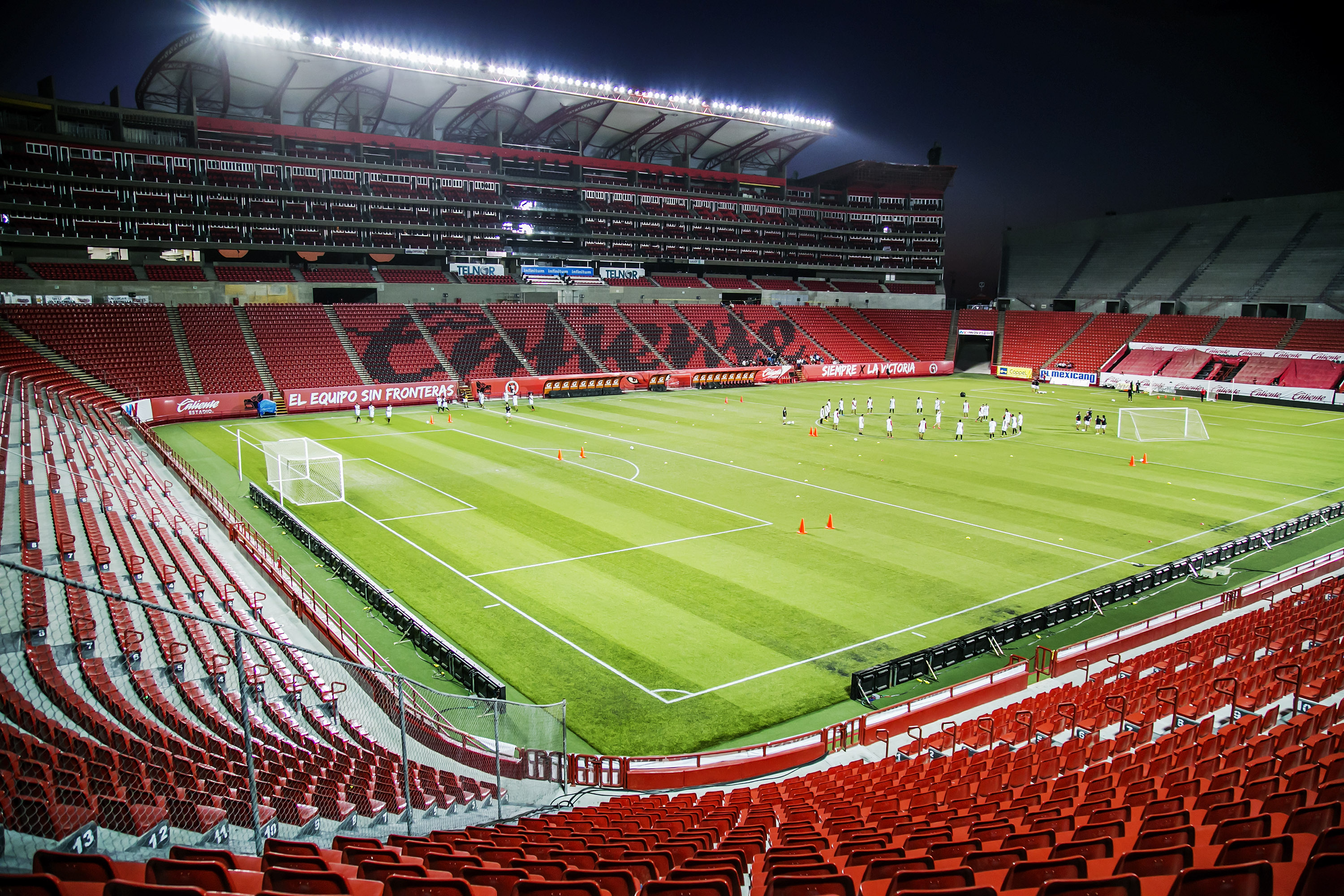
Estadio Caliente, home to Club Tijuana of the Liga MX

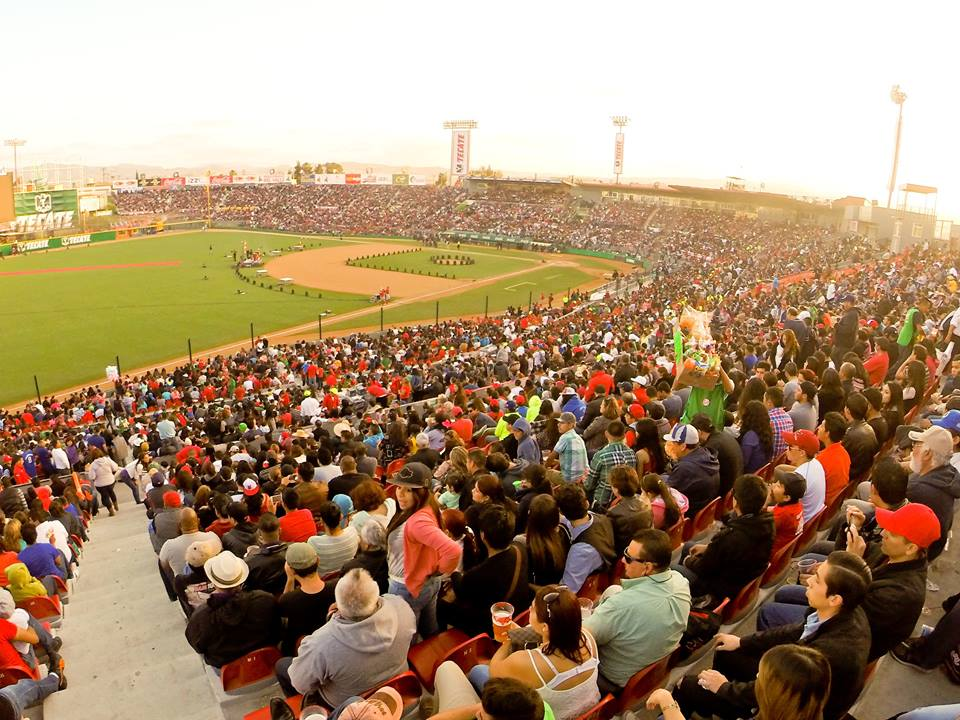
Estadio Chevron, home to Toros de Tijuana of the Liga Mexicana de Béisbol

Estadio Caliente

Estadio Caliente is a multi-purpose stadium in Tijuana, serving as the match venue for Club Tijuana, a Liga MX México Primera División football team. It is mainly used for football matches and has a seating capacity of 27,333 spectators.

Estadio Chevron

The Chevron Stadium is the home of the Toros de Tijuana. It opened in 1977 and housed the Colts missing Tijuana Mexican Pacific League. Subsequently, the stadium was used for football matches. For 2004, professional baseball returned, now with a franchise LMB under the name of Toros de Tijuana, which, the following year, changed its name to Colts as it had been known previously.

At first the facility was called Cerro Colorado Stadium, due to its location at the foot of the hill of that name. With the return of baseball, chain supermarkets Calimax bought the naming rights to the stadium. In 2004, the first season of Toros, the fans filled the stadium for most matches. On 4 April 2013, the stadium was remodeled, marking the beginning of a new era for Toros de Tijuana.

== Transportation ==
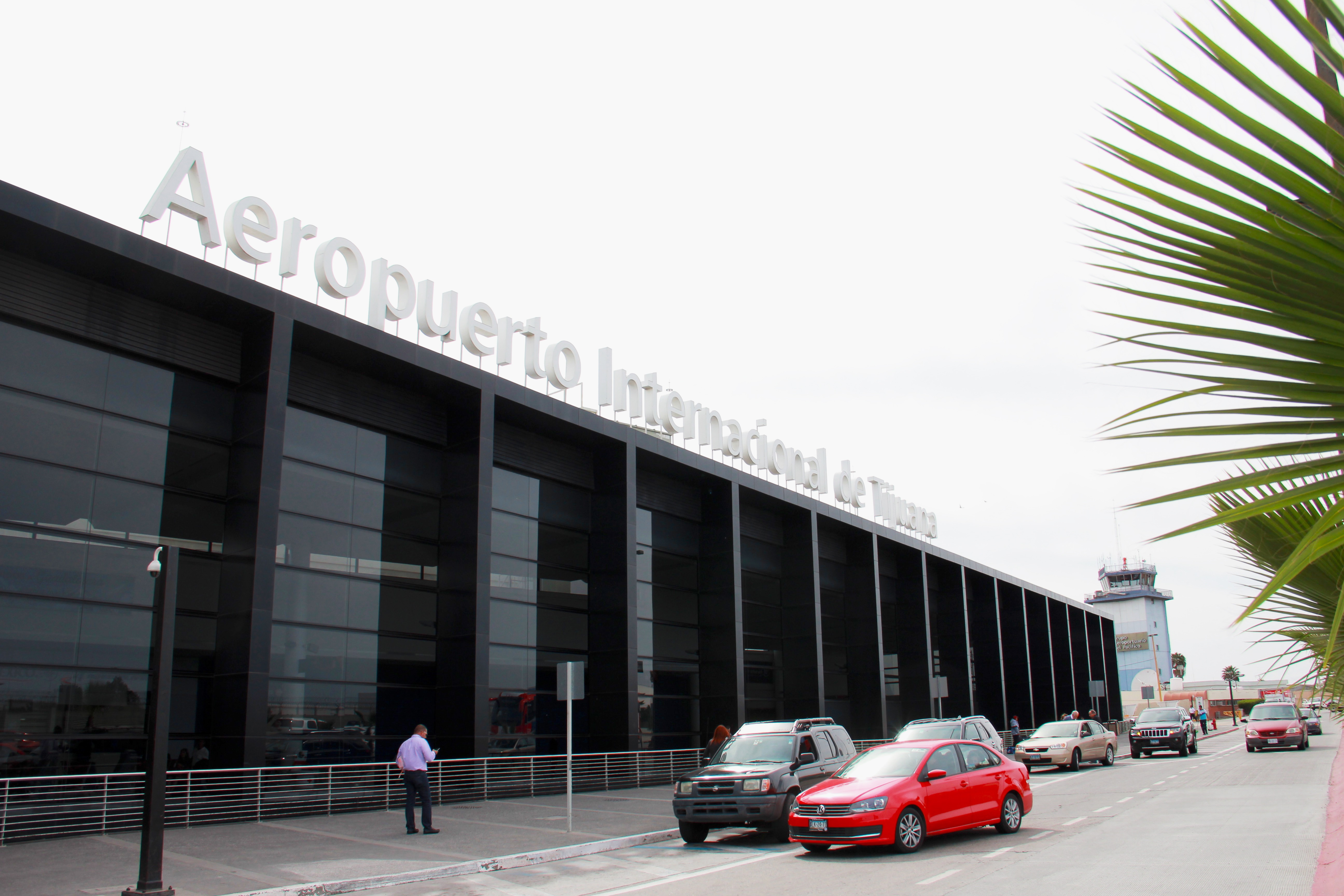
Tijuana International Airport

Tijuana is a major gateway to the interior of Mexico to which it is connected by air and road directly, and by sea via the ports of Ensenada and San Diego. Within Tijuana there are freeways and other roads, and buses, but no passenger rail.

Local public transportation in Tijuana is run by semiprivate companies, and has one of the most complex, or perhaps unorganized networks.

=== Air ===
The Tijuana International Airport is the city's main airport, one of the busiest in Mexico, and serves several airlines with destinations all across Mexico. It is also a second main airport for the San Diego area for passengers heading south into Mexico and Latin America, who may use the airport's Cross Border Xpress terminal located on the U.S. side of the border in Otay Mesa and connected to the rest of the airport on the Mexican side by a pedestrian toll bridge. U.S., European, Asian and Canadian destinations can be reached via San Diego International Airport, located about 35 kilometers (22 mi) north of the international border.

=== Highways ===
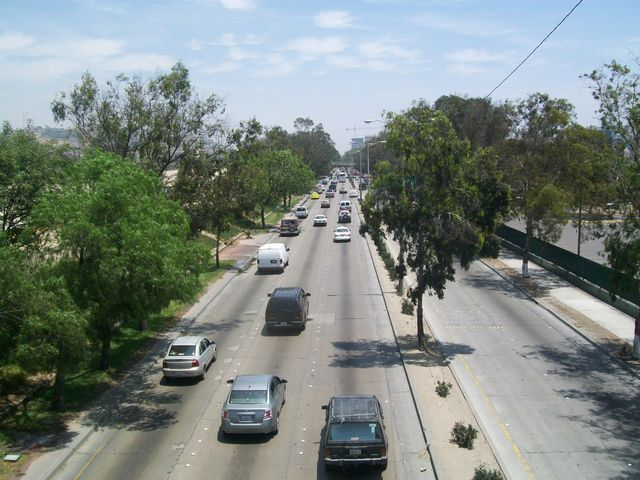
Vía Rápida in Tijuana

Two important Mexican federal highway corridors start in Tijuana. One of them is Fed 1, which runs south through the Baja California Peninsula through Rosarito Beach, Baja Mar, and Ensenada before ending in Cabo San Lucas, Baja California Sur. From Tijuana to Ensenada, most travelers take Fed 1D (scenic road), a four-lane, limited-access toll road that runs along the coast, starting at Playas de Tijuana. Fed 2 runs east for 1,000 kilometers (620 miles) near the international border, as far as Ciudad Juárez, Chihuahua.

Within the metropolitan area the Corredor Tijuana-Rosarito 2000 freeway connects Mesa de Otay in the northeast of the city with Rosarito Beach in the southwest.

Just north of the San Ysidro border crossing, Interstate 5 and Interstate 805 head northbound to San Diego and beyond. From the Otay Mesa border crossing, California State Route 905 takes drivers west to connect with California State Route 125 toll road, as well as both I-805 and I-5.

=== Border crossing ===
Tijuana is one of the border cities with the highest volume of traffic and a vibrant cultural dynamic. It is located in close proximity to California, in the United States. Currently, border crossings are possible via the Otay (Otay Mesa), San Ysidro, Chaparral/PedWest, and airport ports of entry—whether on foot, by car, or by motorcycle.

=== Transit ===
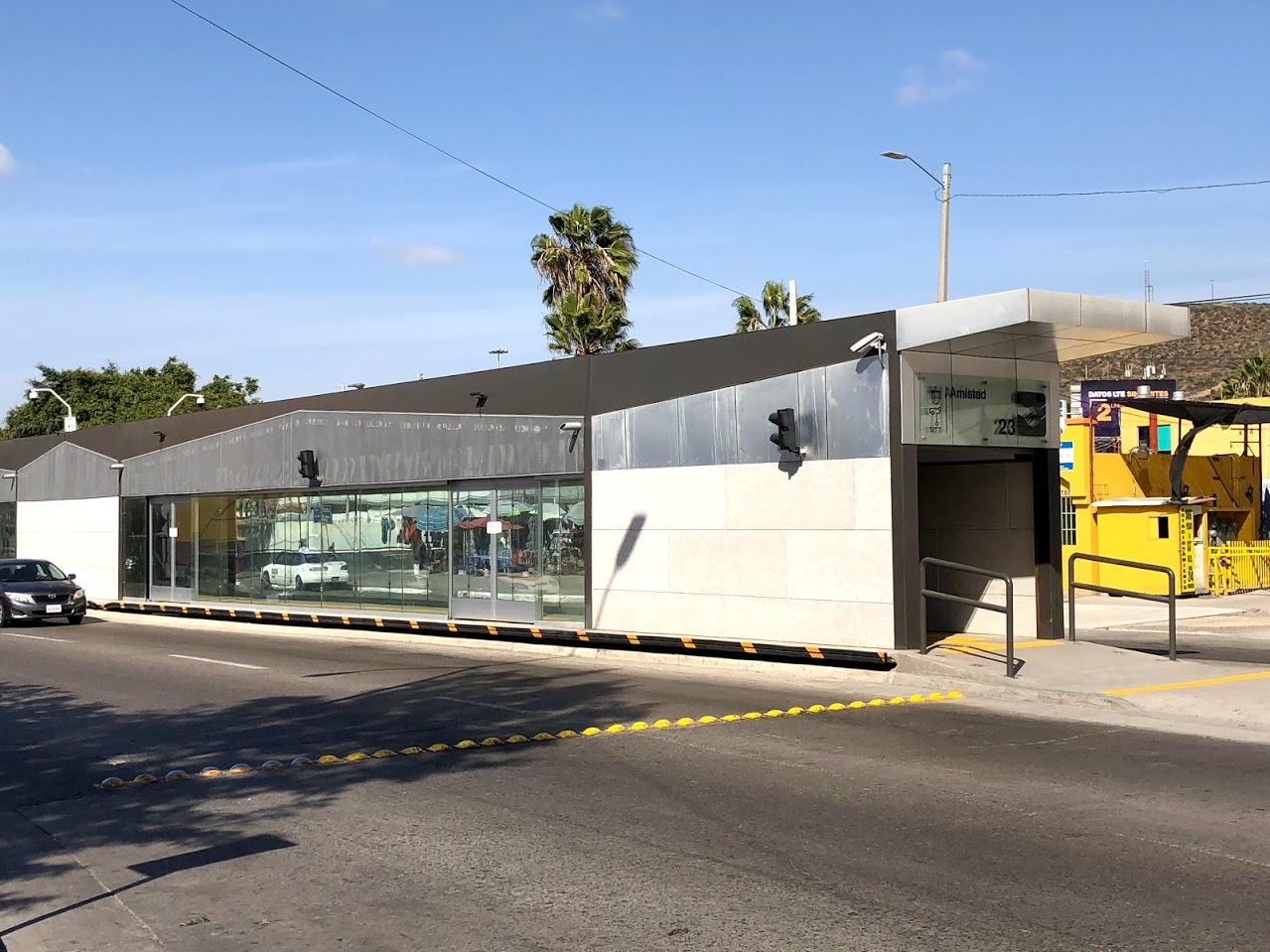
Amistad bus rapid transit (BRT) station

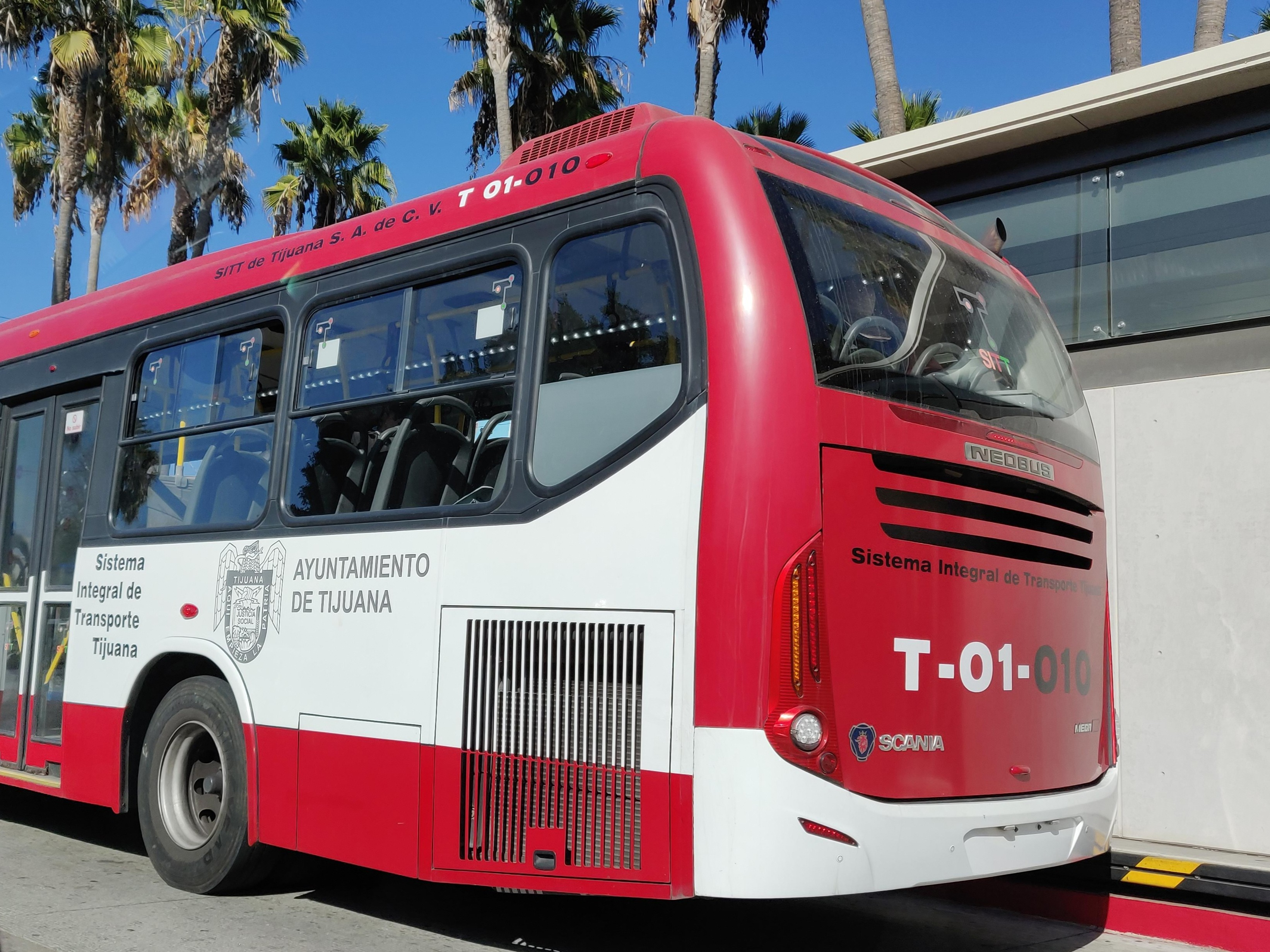
A Tijuana BRT bus

The city's main bus station is in its eastern borough. A small terminal downtown serves a few Mexican bus lines, and U.S.-based Greyhound Lines and Crucero USA. Another bus station near the border provides frequent service to Ensenada, and other major cities—including Mazatlán, Culiacán, Hermosillo, and Guadalajara. Major bus lines operating in Tijuana include Azul y Blanco de Magallanes (Blue & White) and Transporte Efectivo Express de Tijuana – TEEXTI; modernizing system originally intended to phase out the other lines that partially introduced but ceased and merged with Azul y Blanco.

A bus rapid transit system, named SITT, operates one route from Downtown Tijuana and Garita Puerto Mexico near the San Ysidro Port of Entry, southeasterly along the Tijuana River to Terminal Insurgentes in the southeast of the city. It is part of a planned system of main and feeder lines to replace other buses and minibuses.

In 2006, Tijuana underwent a major overhaul of its existing system of guayines, or shared fixed-route station wagons, forcing the replacement of the guayines with new models of vans, serving as fixed-route taxis. Major transit hubs include Centro (Downtown Tijuana), Otay, Soler, and the Cinco y Diez avenues. Taxi lines operating in the city include Free Taxis, those that do not maintain a specific route; Economic Taxis; Diamond Taxis – black or yellow cabs; and regular taxis maintaining a set route. There are as many bus lines and routes as fixed-route taxi ones or calafias, and new routes for buses, taxis or calafias are frequently created, due to high demand of public transportation. Public transportation service is inexpensive, with bus tickets at maximum, US$0.75. Fixed-route taxis are somewhat more expensive, depending on the taxi route, reaching US$2.00. Bus, taxi and calafia lines and routes are distinguished from one another by their vehicles colors. However, there is no public record for these routes, set timetables, or fixed bus stops, making Tijuana's public transportation services very unreliable especially for lesser served areas. Locals generally transmit this type of information (routes) by word of mouth.

In March 2021, the Secretariat of Infrastructure, Communications and Transportation (Mexico) approved a state contract for the design, construction, and operation of the first phase of a Tijuana-Tecate interurban rail line. The 27 km (17 mi) segment will connect the San Ysidro-Tijuana land port of entry to Ejido Maclovio Rojas municipality in Tijuana's east and will include seven intermediate stations – Kino, Américas Oriente/Xolos, La 5 y 10, Swap Meet Siglo XX1, García, Terán Terán and El 2000.

== International relations ==
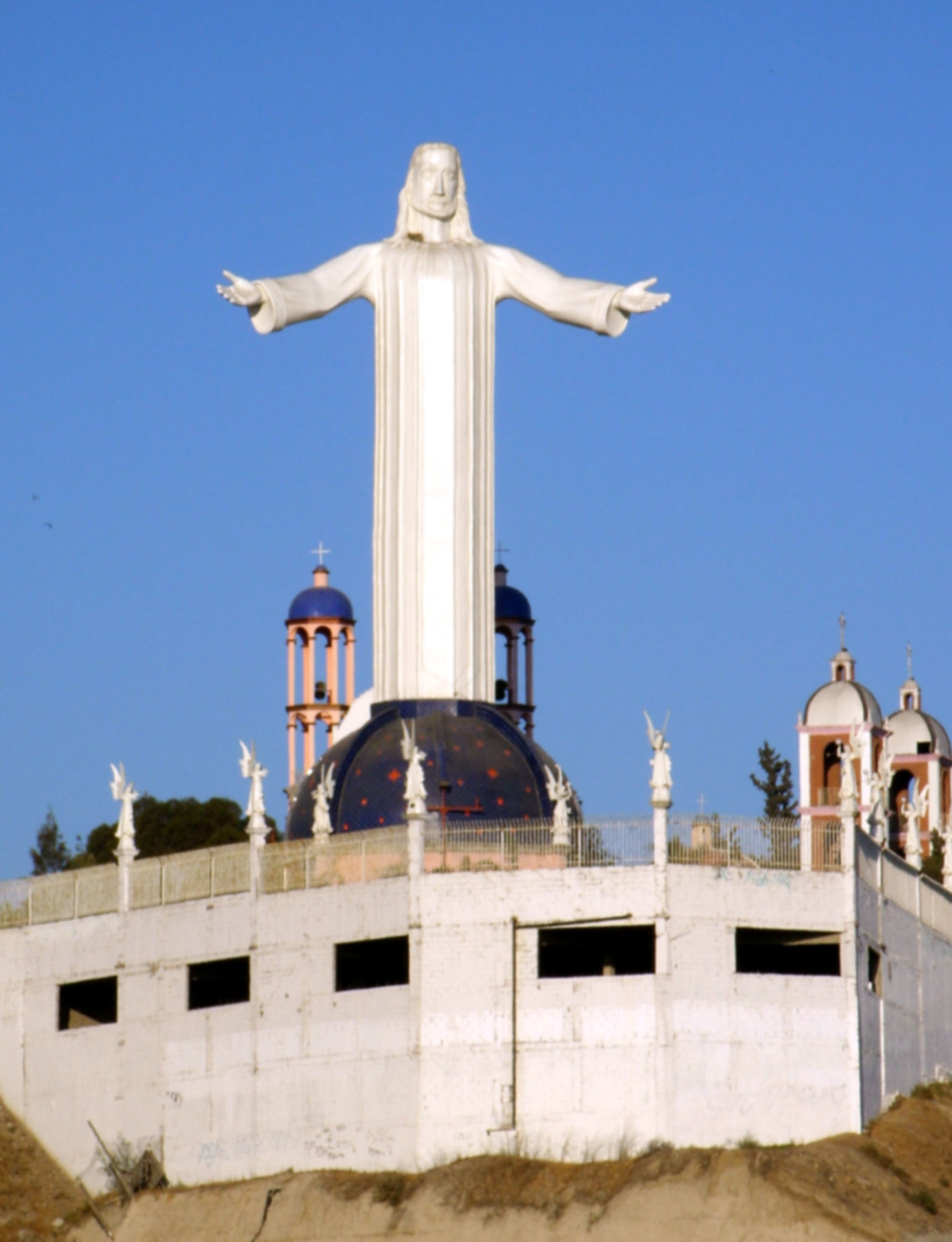
Cristo Rey statue near Colonia Los Álamos

Tijuana has multiple sister cities and twin towns. These relations have been formalized by a variety of organizations as well as municipal governments. Currently twinned with the City of Tijuana are:

City	Nation	Since
Busan	South Korea	1995
San Diego	United States	
La Paz	Mexico	2018
León	Mexico	
Mazatlán	Mexico	
Panjin	China	
Havana	Cuba	
Cincinnati	United States	
Zaragoza	Spain	
Medellín	Colombia	
Laredo	United States	
Słubice	Poland	1998
Wuhan	China	2013

== See also ==
- Municipalities of Baja California
- LGBTQ culture in Tijuana
