= Dorian's =

Mexican department store chain, 1959–2009

Coordinates: 32.5345253°N 117.0408529°W

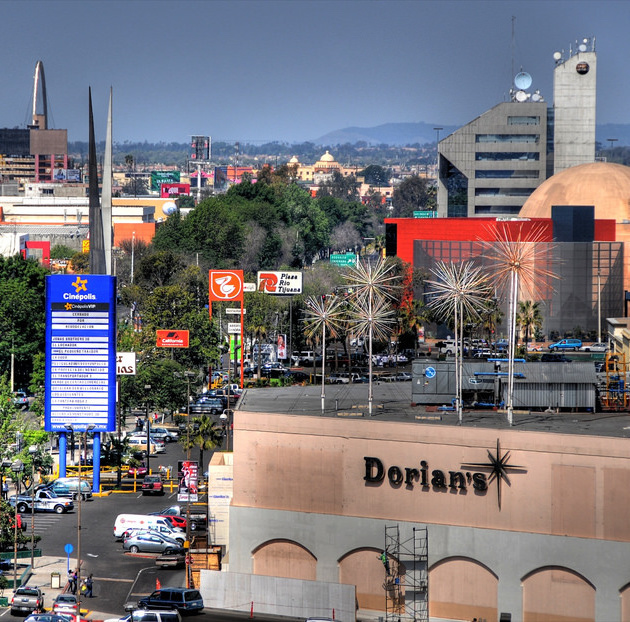
- Dorian's store at Plaza Río Tijuana before it became a Sears branch in 2009
- Industry: Retail
- Founded: 1959 in Tijuana, Baja California
- Founders: Salomón Cohen Achmi; Herman Hirsh ("Dori"; later Pedro Dorian); Miguel Goldstein; Ángel García Vásquez
- Defunct: 2009
- Fate: Stores converted to Sears
- Successor: Sears Mexico
- Headquarters: Tijuana, Baja California, Mexico
- Number of locations: 14 (2009)
- Area served: Baja California, Baja California Sur and Sonora; later northern and central Mexico and the Yucatán Peninsula
- Parent: Grupo Sanborns (2004–2009)
- Subsidiaries: DAX

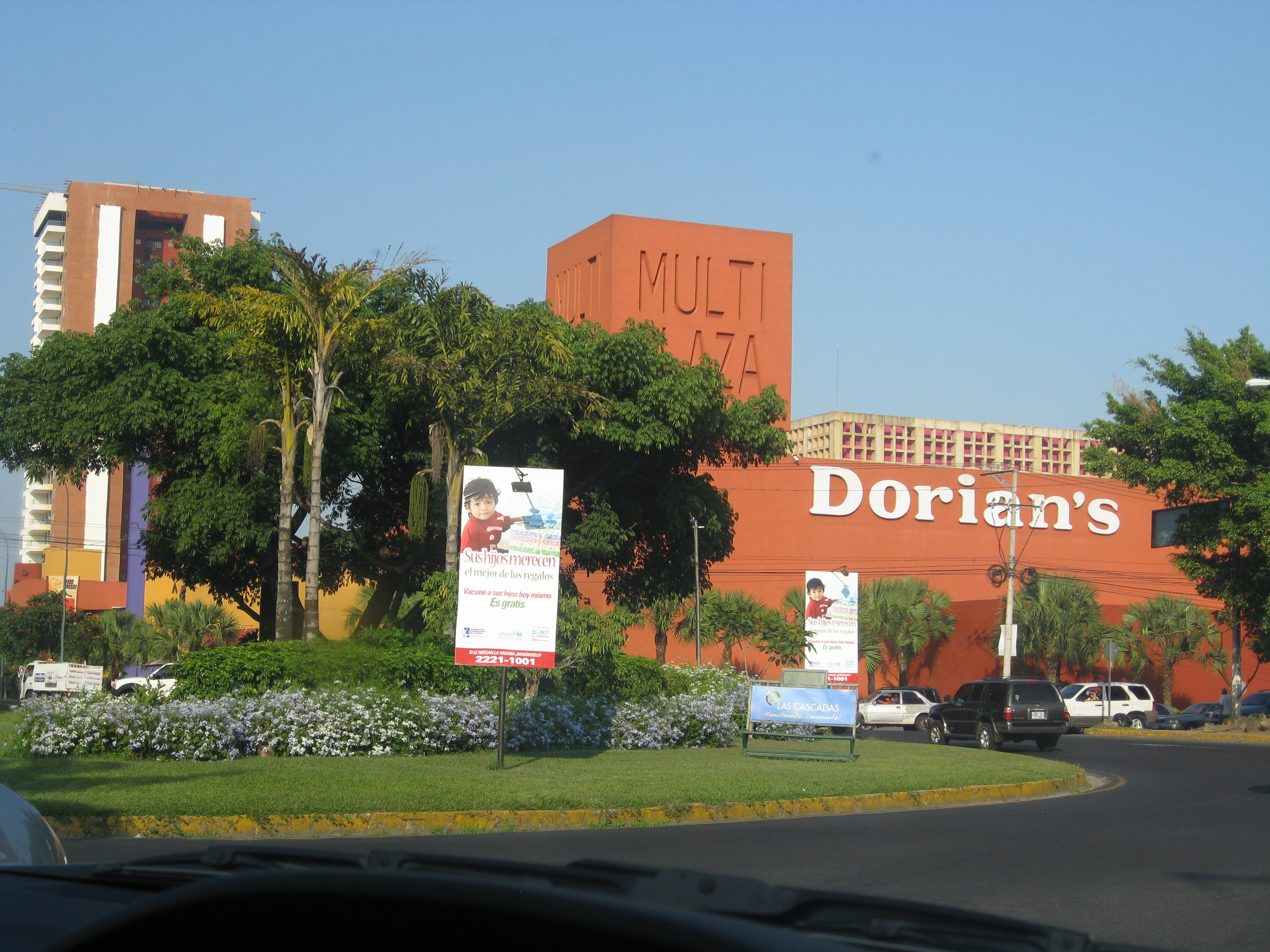
Dorian's at Multiplaza Panamericana in San Salvador metro area, El Salvador

Dorian's was a department store chain based in Tijuana, Baja California, Mexico. Founded in downtown Tijuana in 1959, it grew into a regional chain aimed at both local shoppers and cross-border tourists, and in 1989 it launched the beauty and variety chain DAX. Carlos Slim's Grupo Carso acquired the company through its retail arm, Grupo Sanborns, in 2004. In 2009 the chain was absorbed into Sears Mexico and the Dorian's name was retired.

== History ==
=== Founding ===
Dorian's was founded in 1959 by four partners: Salomón Cohen Achmi; Herman Hirsh, nicknamed "Dori" and later known as Pedro Dorian; Miguel Goldstein; and Ángel García Vásquez. Cohen had opened La Marquesita, a clothing and novelty shop on Tijuana's Calle Segunda, in 1953.

According to the Tijuana businessman José Galicot, Dori had survived the Treblinka extermination camp and came to Tijuana from Los Angeles with Goldstein. With García, the two ran a store called La Bola on the site of the city's old post office. When a neighboring Chrysler dealership on Calle Segunda moved out, the four partners joined its premises to La Bola, creating the first Dorian's. The name combined "Dori" with the first two letters of Ángel and the "s" of Salomón, and the store set out to compete with the department stores across the border in San Diego.

=== Growth ===
On November 9, 1977, a fire swept through the downtown block where the store stood. Dorian's reopened after 17 working days, with half of its sales floor housed in tent-like structures in a nearby parking lot. The company's warehouse was later destroyed by a separate fire.

The chain expanded within Tijuana, including a store at the Plaza Río Tijuana mall in the Zona Río, and elsewhere in Baja California and Baja California Sur. In 1989 the group launched DAX, a chain of beauty, personal-care and household-goods stores modeled on American formats.

=== Under Grupo Sanborns ===
After a period of financial difficulty, the company was acquired in 2004 by Grupo Carso, through its subsidiary Grupo Sanborns. Carso held Dorian's Tijuana, S.A. de C.V. through Inmuebles Borgru, S.A. de C.V., itself a subsidiary of Inmuebles Carso, S.A.B. de C.V.

Grupo Sanborns had bought JCPenney's Mexican operation, six department stores in Monterrey, León, Mexico City, Chihuahua, Cancún and Mérida, in late 2003. By 2009, five of those stores, in Cancún, Chihuahua, León, Mérida and San Pedro Garza García in the Monterrey area, were operating as Dorian's.

In October 2004 Dorian's opened a store in the new Las Misiones mall in Ciudad Juárez; it was no longer among the chain's stores in 2009. In May 2005 Grupo Sanborns made its first move outside Mexico, opening a Dorian's department store alongside a Sanborns and a Mixup music store in a shopping center in El Salvador.

=== Conversion to Sears ===
In April 2009 Grupo Carso began integrating the 14 Dorian's department stores into Sears Mexico, with the stores trading under the Sears name. Not every store made the switch. The original downtown Tijuana store, at the corner of Calle Segunda and Avenida Niños Héroes, closed in May 2009. The building later became the Plaza de la Tecnología, an indoor market of small electronics and video-game vendors. In San Pedro Garza García, Plaza Fiesta San Agustín already had a Sears; the Dorian's space there was later redeveloped for restaurants and shops.

DAX beauty and variety stores were not converted. They remained part of Grupo Sanborns and later expanded beyond northern Mexico, reaching 47 stores by the third quarter of 2025.

== Stores in 2009 ==
Before the conversion to Sears, Dorian's operated 14 stores in Mexico and one in El Salvador.

Country	State/Dept.	City	Borough	Colonia	Location	Notes
Mexico	Baja California	Ensenada	Downtown			
Mexico	Baja California	Mexicali	Centro Comercial Cachanilla			
Mexico	Baja California	Tijuana	Centro	Zona Centro	Downtown, Calle Segunda and Avenida Niños Héroes	Original store; closed May 2009
Mexico	Baja California	Tijuana	Centro	Zona Río	Plaza Río Tijuana	
Mexico	Baja California	Tijuana	La Mesa	Cinco y Diez	Plaza Carrousel	
Mexico	Baja California	Tijuana	Otay Centenario	Nueva Tijuana	Centro Comercial Mesa de Otay	
Mexico	Baja California Sur	La Paz	Downtown			
Mexico	Baja California Sur	La Paz	Forjadores			
Mexico	Chihuahua	Chihuahua	Plaza de Sol			Former JCPenney
Mexico	Guanajuato	León	Plaza Mayor			Former JCPenney
Mexico	Nuevo León	San Pedro Garza García	Plaza Fiesta San Agustín			Former JCPenney; closed, as the mall already had a Sears
Mexico	Quintana Roo	Cancún	Plaza Las Américas			Former JCPenney
Mexico	Sonora	San Luis Río Colorado	Avenida Madero and Calle 3, Zona Centro			
Mexico	Yucatán	Mérida	Plaza Las Américas			Former JCPenney
El Salvador	La Libertad	Antiguo Cuscatlán (San Salvador metro area)	Multiplaza Panamericana			Opened May 2005 together with a Sanborns and a Mixup Converted to a Sears which (re)opened in 2010.
