= DAX (store) =

Mexican retail chain

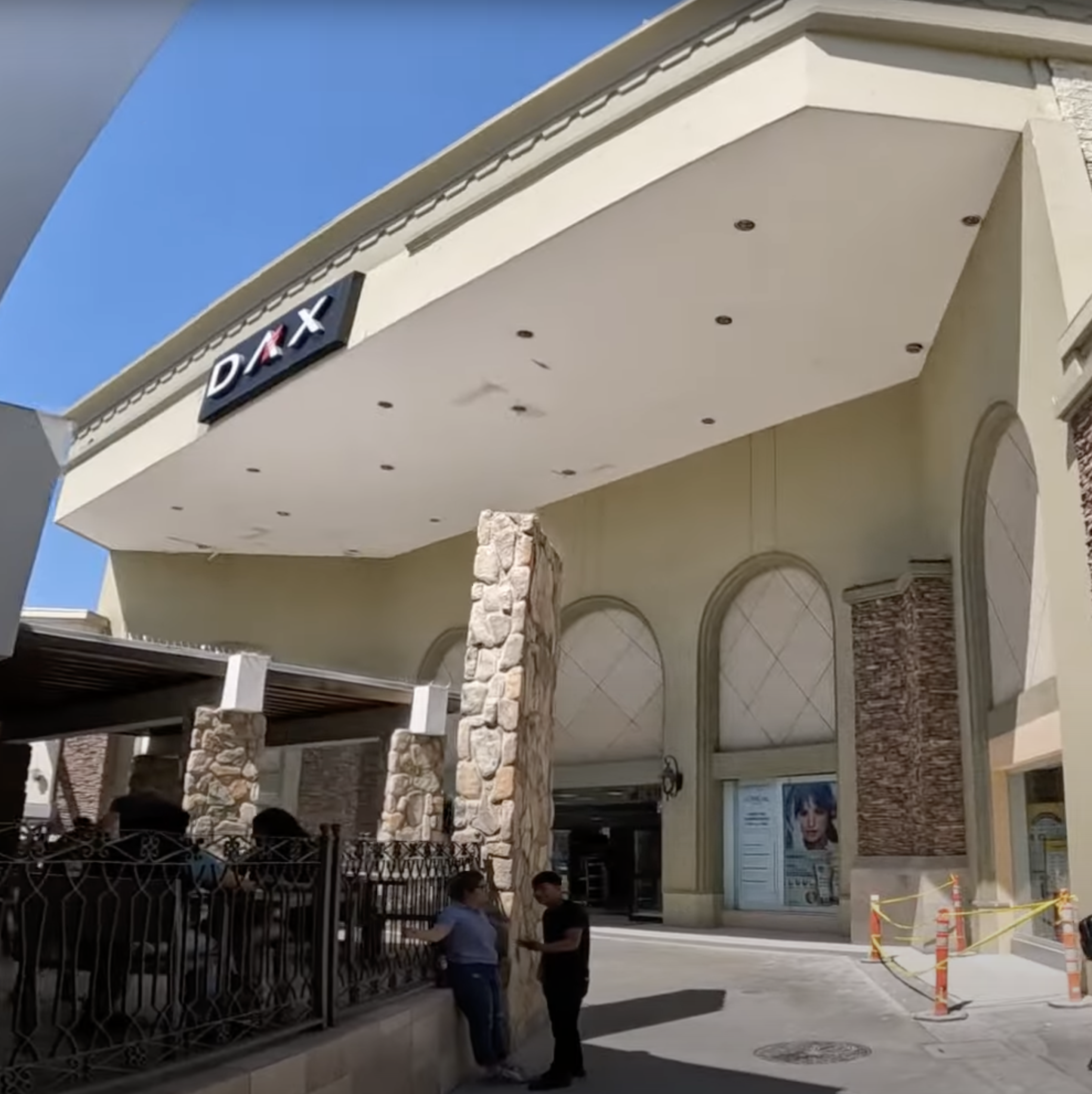
DAX Plaza Río Tijuana in 2023

DAX is a chain of 25 beauty and variety stores in Mexico based in Tijuana, Baja California, the country's sixth largest metropolitan area. The stores are modeled along the United States model of large pharmacies such as CVS or Walgreens, selling cosmetics, beauty supplies, and a limited range of kitchen supplies, decorative accessories, small appliances and electronics. DAX states that it is targeted at women. It can be characterized as a variety store, beauty store, and pharmacy.

== History ==
DAX was originally launched by Dorian's, a now-defunct 14-store Tijuana-based department store chain. Carlos Slim's Grupo Carso bought Dorian's Tijuana, S.A. de C.V. in 2004. The Dorian's brand came to an end in 2009 when Carso converted the Dorian's stores to Sears. DAX stores are now part of Grupo Carso's retail arm, Grupo Sanborns, which also includes Sears, Sanborns, and iShopMixup.

Within Grupo Sanborns, DAX is part of the Sanborns division which as of December 2020 included:

- Sanborns junior department stores-and-restaurants
- Sanborns Home&Fashion stores
- Sanborns Café restaurants
- 2 Saks Fifth Avenue stores in Mexico City (both have since closed)

DAX had been part of the "Other Formats" division, which (as of the end of 2017) consisted of 57 stores and 71,678 square meters of retail area in the following formats:

- Sanborns Café, with 23 stores with a presence in five states of Mexico
- DAX
- 2 Saks Fifth Avenue stores
- Two shopping malls, Plaza Loreto and Plaza Inbursa
- One Sears store and three Sanborns stores in Central America
- ClaroShop e-commerce portal
- 3 Boutiques

== Coverage ==
DAX has geographic coverage in the following cities (CC="Centro Comercial" i.e. "shopping center"):

=== Tijuana ===
- Centro (Av. Niños Héroes)
- Downtown, Tercera (Calle 3^{a}/3rd Street)
- CC Loma Bonita
- Plaza Playas de Tijuana
- Parque Industrial Pacífico
- CC Plaza Carrousel, La Mesa
- Ruíz
- Otay
- Plaza Río Tijuana
  (branded as "Super DAX" for its size.
  Note: it is not a supermarket.)
- CC Plaza Papalote
- CC Monarca
- Boulevard Cucapah
- ElPunto
- La Pajarita
- Rio de la Plata

=== Ensenada ===
- CC Misión
- Reforma, Fracc. Valle Dorado

=== Mexicali ===
- Calzada Justo Sierra
- CC Cachanilla
- CC Cataviña
- Plaza Juventud
- Plaza Nuevo Mexicali
- CC Santa Bárbara

=== Other in Baja California State ===
- San Luis Río Colorado
- Tecate

=== La Paz, Baja California Sur ===
- La Paz (Zona Centro)
- CC El Punto
- Alameda (Camino Real)

=== Mexico City ===
- Plaza Parque Tepeyac
- Av. Río de la Plata, Reforma Colonia Cuauhtémoc
- Plaza Carso

=== Rest of Greater Mexico City ===
- Plaza Tlalnepantla, Tlalnepantla de Baz, State of Mexico
- Plaza Las Americas, Ecatepec, State of Mexico
