= Salomón Cohen Achmi =

Mexican businessman (1933–2025)

- Born: December 1933; Mexico City, Mexico
- Died: 27 August 2025 (aged 91); Tijuana, Baja California, Mexico
- Occupations: Businessman, real estate developer
- Known for: Co-founding Dorian's
- Spouses: Mari Juana (died); Carolina Aubanel (m. 2019)

Salomón Cohen Achmi (December 1933 – 27 August 2025) was a Mexican businessman in Tijuana, Baja California. He was a co-founder of the department store chain Dorian's, where he ran international buying, and later developed shopping centers in the city, including Paseo Chapultepec and the World Trade Center Tijuana.

== Early life and La Marquesita ==
Cohen was born in Mexico City and moved to Tijuana as a child. His family ran La Marquesita, a clothing and novelty shop on the city's Calle Segunda. According to his childhood friend José Galicot, Cohen took over the shop at about 16, after his father's death, and with help from friends got a creditor's seizure of the store lifted. He worked long days and bought merchandise in Los Angeles. Obituaries date the store's opening, in downtown Tijuana, to 1953.

== Dorian's ==
In 1959 Cohen joined Herman Hirsh ("Dori"), Miguel Goldstein and Ángel García Vásquez in founding Dorian's, which grew into one of the best-known department store chains in northwestern Mexico. The name took its final "s" from his first name. Cohen ran the company's purchasing, traveling often to South Korea, Taiwan, China and Japan, where suppliers came to know him as a skilled negotiator who paid on time. His name was also associated with the group's other retail formats, including DAX, Extra and Sólo un Precio. Grupo Carso bought the chain in 2004.

== Real estate ==
Cohen was involved in the development of Plaza Río Tijuana, the city's first large American-style mall. In 2005 he founded SCA Inmobiliaria, which designs, builds and manages retail space and shopping centers. Its projects include the World Trade Center Tijuana, Paseo Chapultepec and Paseo del Parque. He also ran parking facilities and rental retail premises. Paseo Chapultepec, a US$13 million plaza built mainly around restaurants, opened in October 2013. Cohen cut the ribbon with Governor José Guadalupe Osuna Millán and Mayor Carlos Bustamante Anchondo, and the project was expected to create more than 700 jobs.

== Philanthropy and recognition ==
Cohen supported the Mexican Red Cross, the Mainly Mozart Festival, the Castro-Limón Foundation, the El Trompo interactive museum and the charity Gilberto A.C. In 2015 he was inducted into Tijuana's Paseo de la Fama by Tijuana Innovadora. The Tijuana Consejo Coordinador Empresarial gave him its Galardón al Mérito Empresarial (business merit award) in 2019.

== Personal life and death ==
Cohen's first wife, Mari Juana, a prominent figure in Tijuana society, died before him; the couple had no children. In 2019 he married the businesswoman and broadcaster Carolina Aubanel, who cared for him in his last years. He died at the Hospital Del Prado in Tijuana on 27 August 2025. Zeta gave his age as 92, although AFN Tijuana reported a birth date of December 1933.
