= Centro (borough) =

- Borough (Delegación) of Tijuana
- Delegación Centro
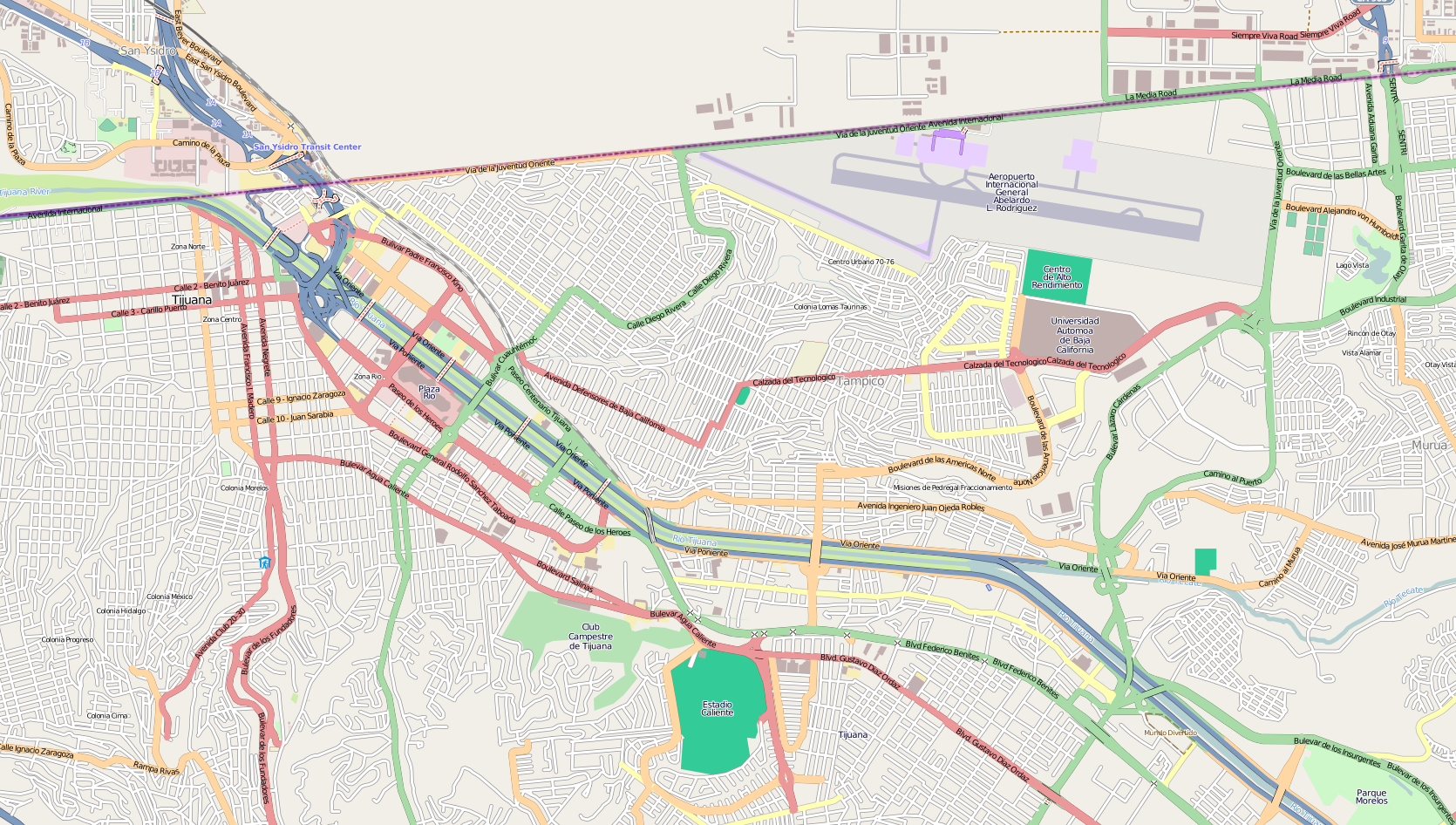
- Location within Central Tijuana
- Coordinates: 32.531618°N 117.042203°W
- Country: Mexico
- State: Baja California
- Municipality (municipio): Tijuana
- Area code: 664

Centro is a borough of the municipality of Tijuana in Baja California, Mexico. It is the main historical and economic borough of Tijuana.

Delegación Centro includes the old downtown, or Zona Centro, the new business district (Zona Río), Zona Norte (the red-light district), Agua Caliente, and other adjacent neighborhoods ("zonas"). This is the historical midpoint of Tijuana; City Hall is located here as well as most of the tourist areas such as Avenida Revolución, and the business districts. The Tijuana Cultural Center (CECUT for CEntro CUltural de Tijuana) and Plaza Río, until recently the largest mall in the state, are both located here in the Zona Río.

== History ==
In the mid-nineteenth century, the land that is now the downtown area of the city, belonged to the ranch of Don Santiago Argüello, which was occupied for livestock. Argüello lived until 1862, but after his death, his family continued to live on the ranch, so the children and grandchildren were forming families that settled on their property.
