= Plaza Fiesta San Agustín =

- Location: Monterrey, Mexico
- Coordinates: 25°39′04″N 100°20′18″W
- Opened: 1988
- Manager: Inmobiliaria Real San Agustín, S.A.
- Num. of stores: 350
- Num. of anchor tenants: 4
- Floors: 2 (4 including subterranean parking and an MMCinemas cinema multiplex)
- Website: www.plazafiestamall.com

Plaza Fiesta San Agustín is one of the largest shopping malls in Mexico, and the largest located in the metropolitan area of Monterrey. Founded in 1988, it has grown to include shops and department stores dedicated to over 150 commercial activities.

It is administered by Inmobiliaria Real San Agustín, S.A.

== Notable Attractions ==
- Three anchor stores including Sanborns, Soriana and Sears
- Numerous full service restaurants, banks, and clothing stores
- Government Offices
- Cinemex cinema multiplex
- Cinépolis VIP movie theater (Closed)
- Camino Real Monterrey
