= Carlos Slim Domit =

Mexican businessman

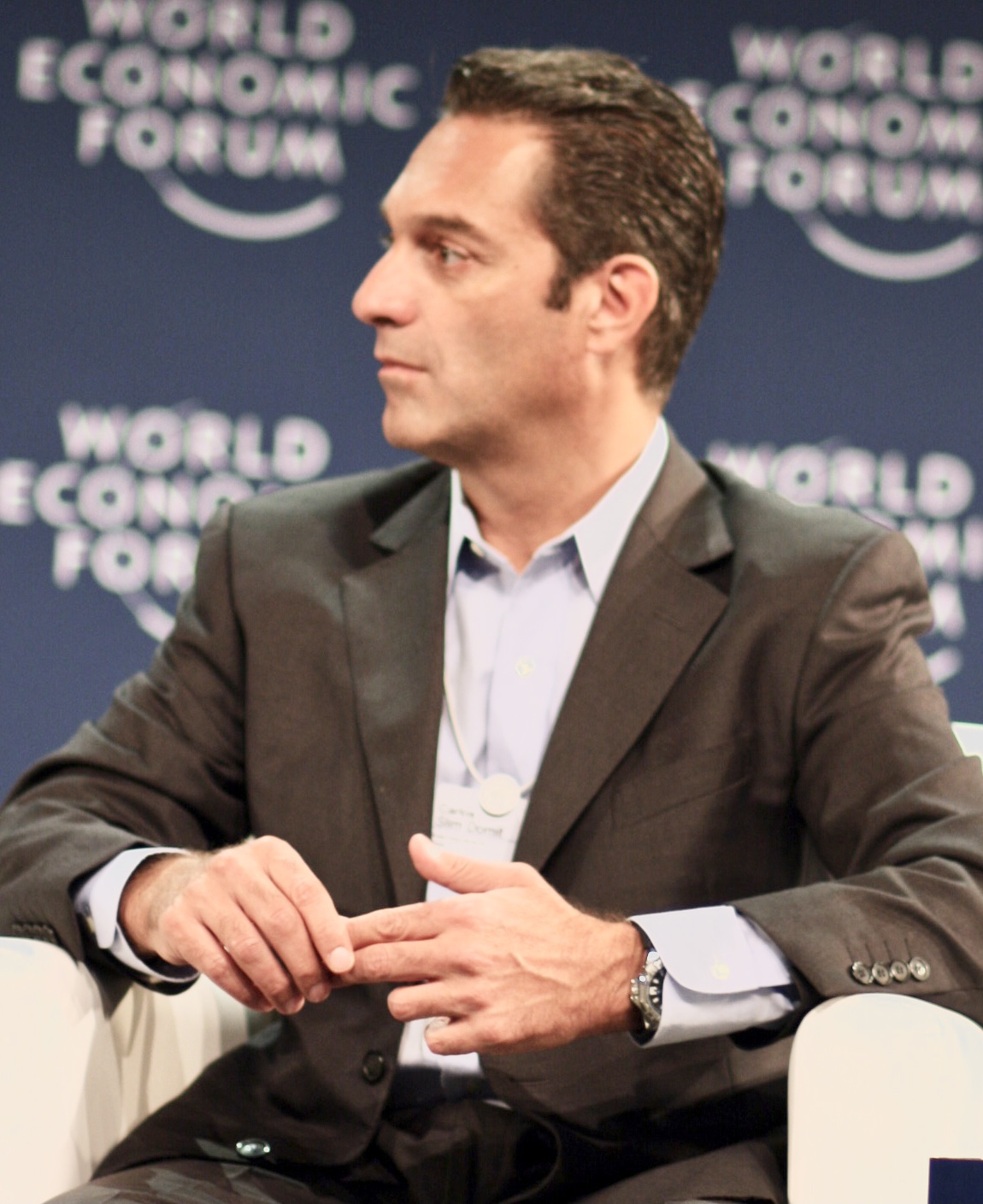
- Carlos Slim Domit at the World Economic Forum on Latin America in 2012
- Born: 1967 (age 58–59); Mexico City, Mexico
- Education: Universidad Anáhuac México (BBA)
- Occupation: Businessman
- Known for: Chairman of the Board of Grupo Carso
- Parents: Carlos Slim (father); Soumaya Domit (mother)

Carlos Slim Domit (born 1967) is a Mexican businessman and the son of Carlos Slim Helú.

== Early life ==
Carlos Slim Domit was born in 1967 in Mexico and is of Lebanese origin from both his maternal and paternal families. He is the eldest son of Carlos Slim Helú. He holds a degree in business administration from Universidad Anáhuac.

== Career ==
Slim Domit served as the co-chairman of the ICT Task Force at the B20 2012 and co-chair of the WEF Latin America in 2015, and currently serves as chairman of the board of America Movil, Grupo Carso, Grupo Sanborns and Telmex.

He is a member of the senate of the FIA, of the board of directors at the Centro de Estudios de Historia de México Carso; member of the Patronage of the Hospital Infantil de México and PRESIDENT of the Instituto Nacional de Nutrición Salvador Zubiran Patronage among other social organizations.
