= Carso Global Telecom =

Mexican telecommunications company

Carso Global Telecom, S.A.B. de C.V.
- Company type: Subsidiary
- Industry: Telecommunications
- Founded: 24 June 1996; 29 years ago
- Headquarters: Mexico City, Mexico.
- Key people: (Chairman & CEO); Jaime Chico Pardo
- Products: Fixed & mobile telecommunications Internet services Cable television
- Revenue: ▲US$ 16.0 Billion (2009)
- Net income: ▲US$ 1.2 billion (2009)
- Number of employees: 82,890 (2009)
- Parent: América Móvil
- Subsidiaries: Telmex

Carso Global Telecom S.A.B. de C.V. is a telecommunications holding company, which through its subsidiaries, provides various telecommunication services. Carso Global Telecom was spun off from Carlos Slim Helú's Grupo Carso conglomerate in 1996. Top Latin American mobile carrier América Móvil bought Carso Global Telecom for about $17.6 billion in mid-2010 as part of a larger $21 billion plan to consolidate Slim's telecom holdings in Latin America.

The Chief Executive Officer and President of the board of directors is Jaime Chico Pardo.

== Companies ==
- Telmex
- Telnor
- Multimedia Corporativo, S.A. DE C.V.
- Global Telecom, LLC
- Empresas y Controles
- Technology and Internet, LLC
- The Telvista company
- MTN
- Carso Telecom B.V.
