= Plaza Carrousel =

Shopping mall in Tijuana, Mexico

Coordinates: 32.4969069°N 116.9590034°W

Plaza Carrousel is a shopping mall in the La Mesa borough of Tijuana, anchored by Sears (formerly Dorian's), a Soriana supermarket (formerly Comercial Mexicana and way before Soriana again), Cinepolis multicinemas, and Sanborn's. The mall was built on the site of the former Cine Carrousel cinema. The area around the mall is a retail hub known as "Cinco y Diez" (Five and Ten), named after a former "five and dime" store located there.
