= Plaza Río Tijuana =

Shopping mall in Tijuana, Mexico

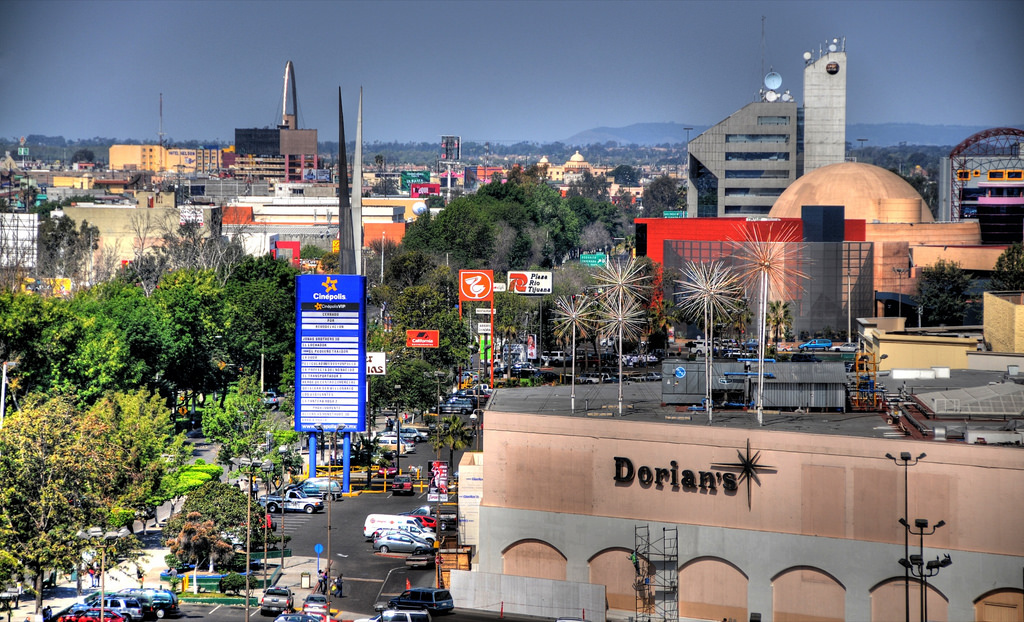
- Plaza Río in the mid-2000s, when Dorian's was one of its anchors
- Location: Zona Río, Tijuana, Baja California, Mexico
- Coordinates: 32°31′42″N 117°1′11″W
- Address: Paseo de los Héroes 96 and 98
- Opened: July 1981
- Num. of stores: 130+ shops and 10 kiosks (2019)
- Num. of anchor tenants: 4
- Floor area: 792,000 sq ft (73,600 m^{2})
- Parking: About 4,000 spaces (2019)

Plaza Río Tijuana is an open-air shopping mall on Paseo de los Héroes in the Zona Río district of Tijuana, Baja California, Mexico. It opened in July 1981 on land reclaimed by the channelization of the Tijuana River, and was the city's first large American-style mall at a time when shopping was concentrated in downtown Tijuana. Its anchors are Soriana, Sears, DAX and Cinépolis.

== History ==
=== Background ===
From the 1960s, successive levels of government sought to turn the flood-prone bed of the Tijuana River into an area for urban and commercial development. The riverbed was treated and then channelized between 1972 and 1976. Another motive was Cartolandia, an informal settlement on the riverbed that officials regarded as an obstacle to the city's development. Its residents were evicted in 1973. In all, 283.97 hectares (701.7 acres) were developed with housing, commercial space and an expressway. Government buildings, the Tijuana Cultural Center and shopping centers were later built on the reclaimed land.

=== Opening and anchors ===
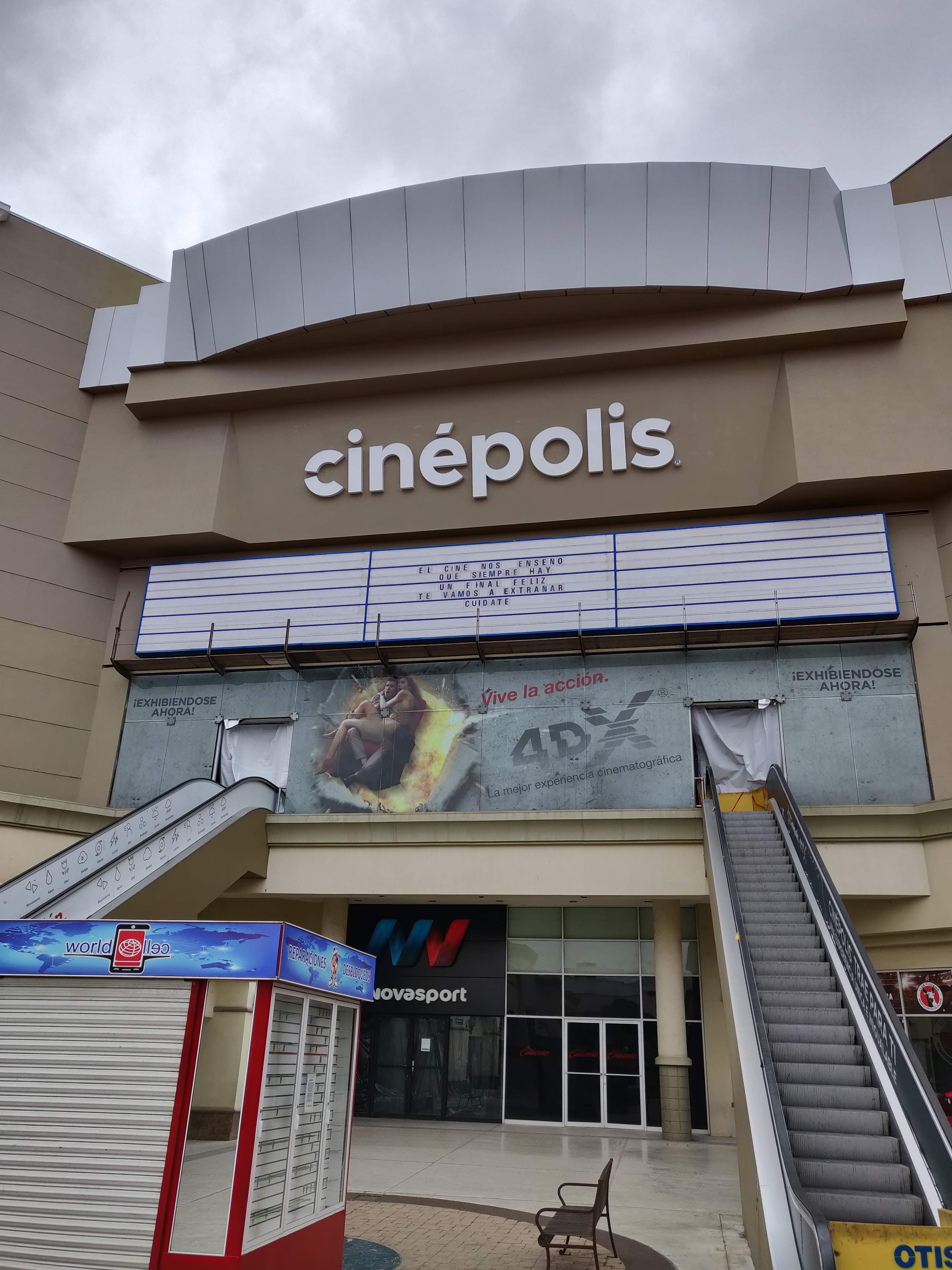
The Cinépolis cinema, closed during the COVID-19 pandemic

Plaza Río opened in July 1981. The businessman Salomón Cohen Achmi, a co-founder of the department store chain Dorian's, took part in its development. Dorian's had a three-floor store at the mall. In 2009 Grupo Carso folded the Dorian's stores into Sears Mexico, and the Plaza Río store began trading as Sears.

Around 2008 the anchors were Dorian's and the supermarket Comercial Mexicana, along with two cinemas, one of them a 14-screen multiplex. By 2015 they were Sears, Comercial Mexicana, Cinépolis, Cinépolis VIP and DAX, a beauty and household-goods chain that Dorian's had launched in 1989. Soriana had bought Comercial Mexicana's stores in 2015, and its right to use the Comercial Mexicana brand expired in June 2018; the Plaza Río store now trades as Soriana.

=== Parking ===
In 2015 the mall had about 3,300 parking spaces, too few on weekends, when more than 13,000 cars arrived in a day. The condominium association of the non-anchor tenants, then headed by José Aguirre Lomelí, planned a five-level, 750-space garage between the DAX store and the food court, facing the expressway, at an estimated cost of 65 million pesos. The garage was completed at a cost of more than 100 million pesos, and by 2019 the mall had about 4,000 spaces. In December 2025 the city government temporarily closed the mall's public parking for operating without the required municipal permits and for safety violations.

== Layout and tenants ==
Plaza Río is an open-air center, with pedestrian walkways between its buildings, at Paseo de los Héroes 96 and 98. The website San Diegan gave its area as 792,000 square feet (73,600 m^{2}) and called it the largest shopping center in Baja California. The mall markets itself as "La mejor manzana de Tijuana" ("Tijuana's best block").

In 2015 it had 130 shops and drew more than 28,000 visitors a day. In 2019 it had more than 130 shops and 10 kiosks, including restaurants, boutiques, shoe and jewelry stores, cinemas, a department store and a supermarket; its general manager that year was Ana Miriam Alcaraz Rodríguez. The mall is surrounded by bars, banks, government offices and the Tijuana Cultural Center.

== See also ==
- List of shopping malls in Mexico
