= Sears in Latin America and Spain =

Sears expanded into Latin America and Spain starting with a small store in Downtown Havana, Cuba in 1942. Sears opened its first store in Mexico City in 1947; the Mexican stores would later spin off into Sears Mexico, now owned by billionaire Carlos Slim's Grupo Sanborns, which by the end of 2022 operated 97 stores across Mexico.

Sears had sales of US$78 million in Latin America in 1953. Over time, Sears expanded into:

Country	First store	No. stores	Presence	Employees 1954	Sold/ Closed	Remarks
Brazil	1949	3 (1954)	1954: São Paulo, Rio de Janeiro, Santos	1,638	1990s	11 stores in 1993 when sold to Malzoni and Vendex, became Mappin stores or malls
Chile (article)	1982	5 (1983)	1983: Santiago		1983	Sears retired in 1983, becoming "Gala" and then sold to Falabella.
Colombia	1953	3 (1954)	1954: Barranquilla, Bogotá, Cartagena, Cali	403		
Costa Rica	1955	n/a	1955: San José, San José	n/a	1982-3	
Cuba	1942	6 (1954)	1954: Havana, Cienfuegos, Holguín, Marianao, Santiago	511	1960	Expropriated for Castro's government,24 October 1960
Ecuador	1999	1	Guayaquil, Albán Borja shopping center		2003	In the 1980s, a Saga Sears operated in Ecuador
El Salvador	2010	n/a	Multiplaza Panamericana, San Salvador	n/a	December 2024 or January 2025	Owned by Mexico's Grupo Sanborns
Guatemala	1976, 2000	n/a	n/a	n/a	1982-3	Operated 1976–1982, and again since 2000, with 2 stores: Guatemala City, Quetzaltenango.
Honduras	?, 2000	n/a	n/a	n/a	1982–3, 2016	Operated ?-1982/3, and again in 2000-2016
Mexico (article)	1947	7 (1954)	1954: Guadalajara, Mérida, Puebla, Mexico City–Colonia Roma, Monterrey, San Luis Potosí, Tampico; End 2022: 97 across Mexico.	2,146	operating	Operating with 97 stores as of end 2022.
Nicaragua	1965	n/a	n/a	n/a	1979	1965–1979
Panama	?	n/a	n/a	n/a	2002	Operated ?-2002
Peru	1954	5 (1954)	1954: Lima		1988	Became Saga then renamed Falabella
Puerto Rico (article)	1961	n/a			2025	Operated 14 full-line department stores and various other formats over its lifespan. Last full-line store closed on August 31, 2025.
Spain	1967	2 (1970)	1970–1983: Barcelona, Madrid		1983	Opened in Barcelona 30 March 1967, opened in Madrid 8 April 1970. Closed in January 1983, became Rumasa's Galerías Preciados.
Venezuela	1950	6 (1954)	1954: Barquisimeto, Caracas (opened 1950), Maracaibo (opened 1952, 12,000 m^{2}, architect Tomás José Sanabria), Maracay, Puerto La Cruz. (Later also Ciudad Ojeda).	1,025		Eventually 3 stores in Caracas: Bello Monte (11,600 m^{2}, Pro-Patria, El Marqués. Acquired by Grupo Cisneros^{[es])}, renamed Maxys, which closed in 1997.

== Gallery ==
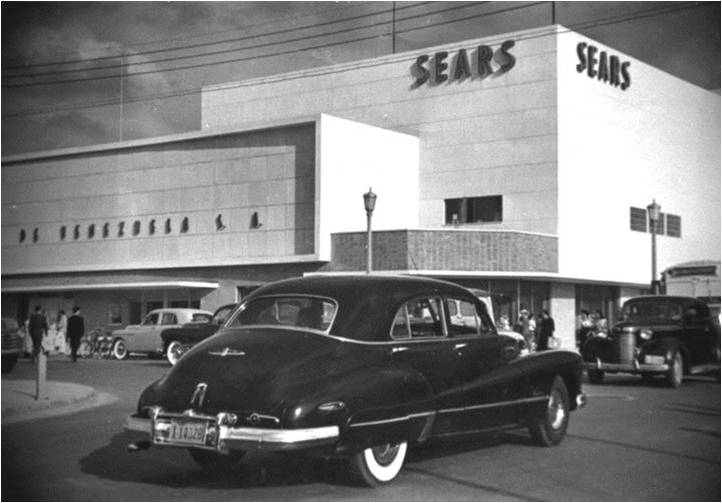
Sears Bello Monte, Caracas in 1950

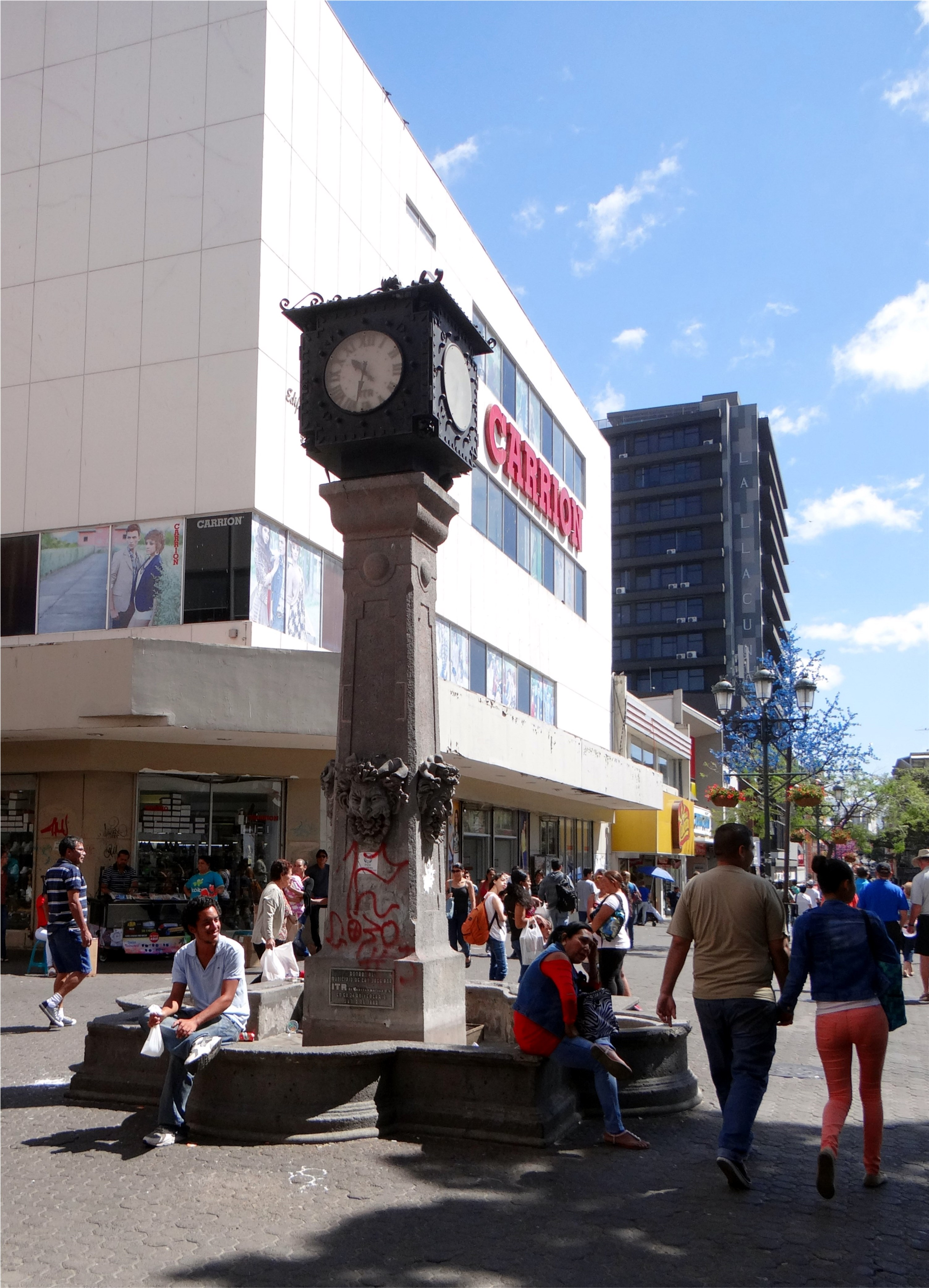
Former Sears on Plaza de la Cultura, San José, Costa Rica, now a Carrion (department store)

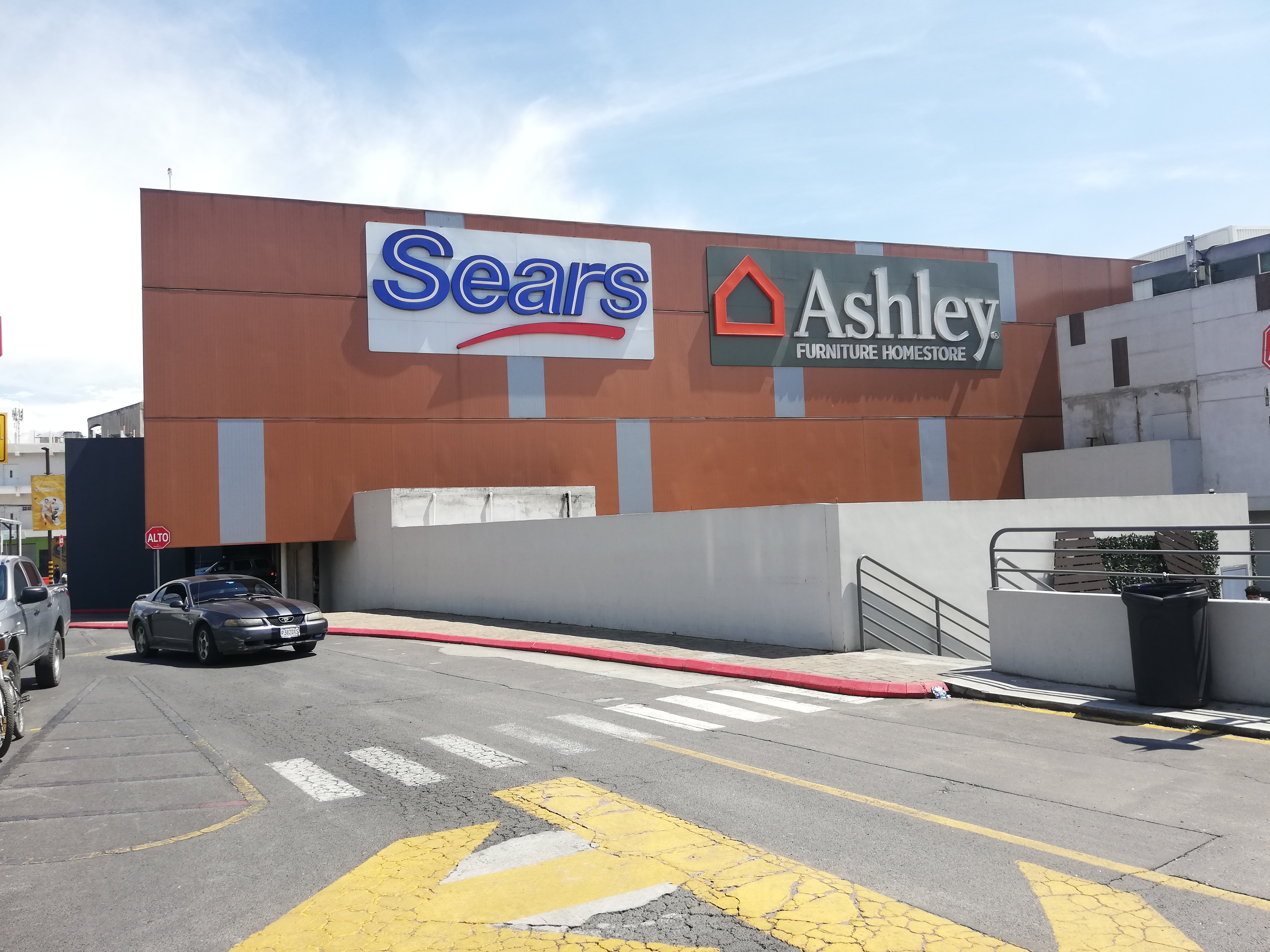
Sears Pradera in Quetzaltenango, Guatemala

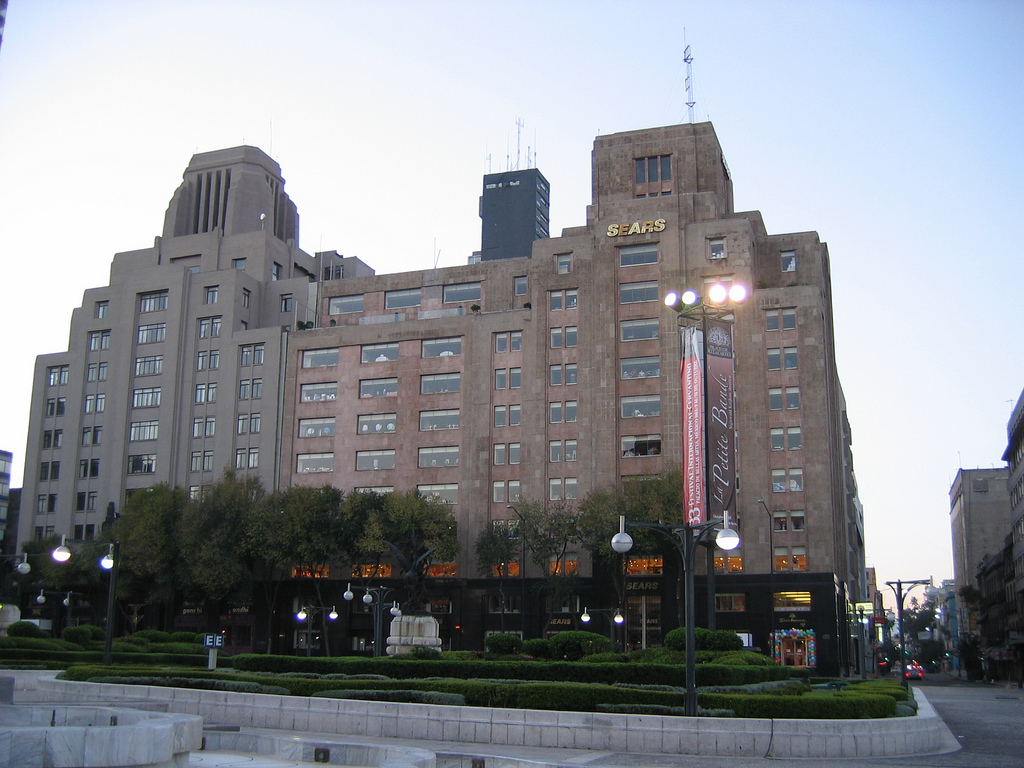
Sears' freestanding store on Avenida Juárez in the Historic center of Mexico City

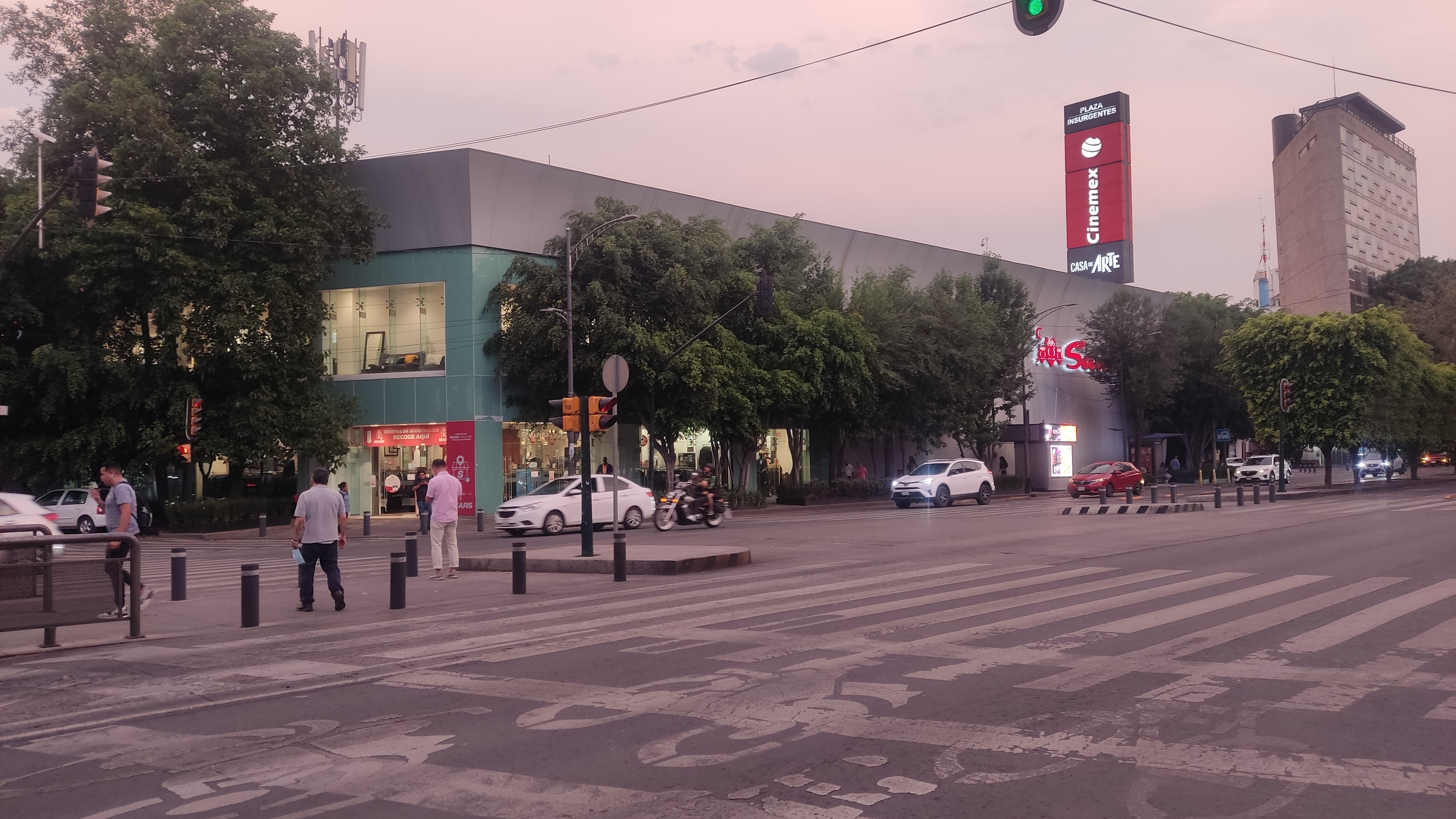
First Sears in Mexico, opened 1947 and since remodeled, now part of Plaza Insurgentes mall, Colonia Roma, Mexico City
