= Cinco y Diez =

La Cinco y Diez
- Intersection, Transit Hub, and Neighborhood in Tijuana
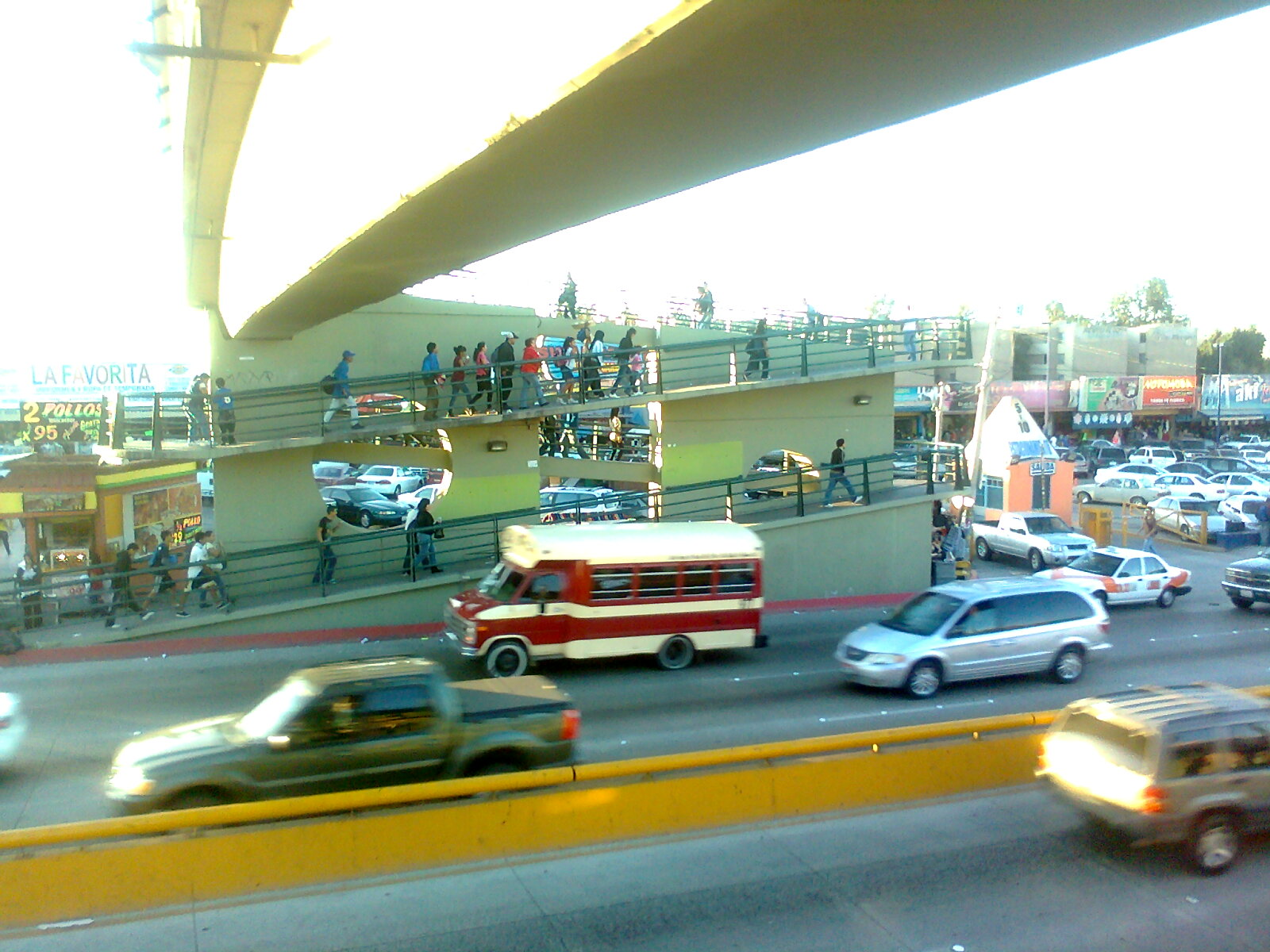
- Traffic and pedestrian bridge at Cinco y Diez

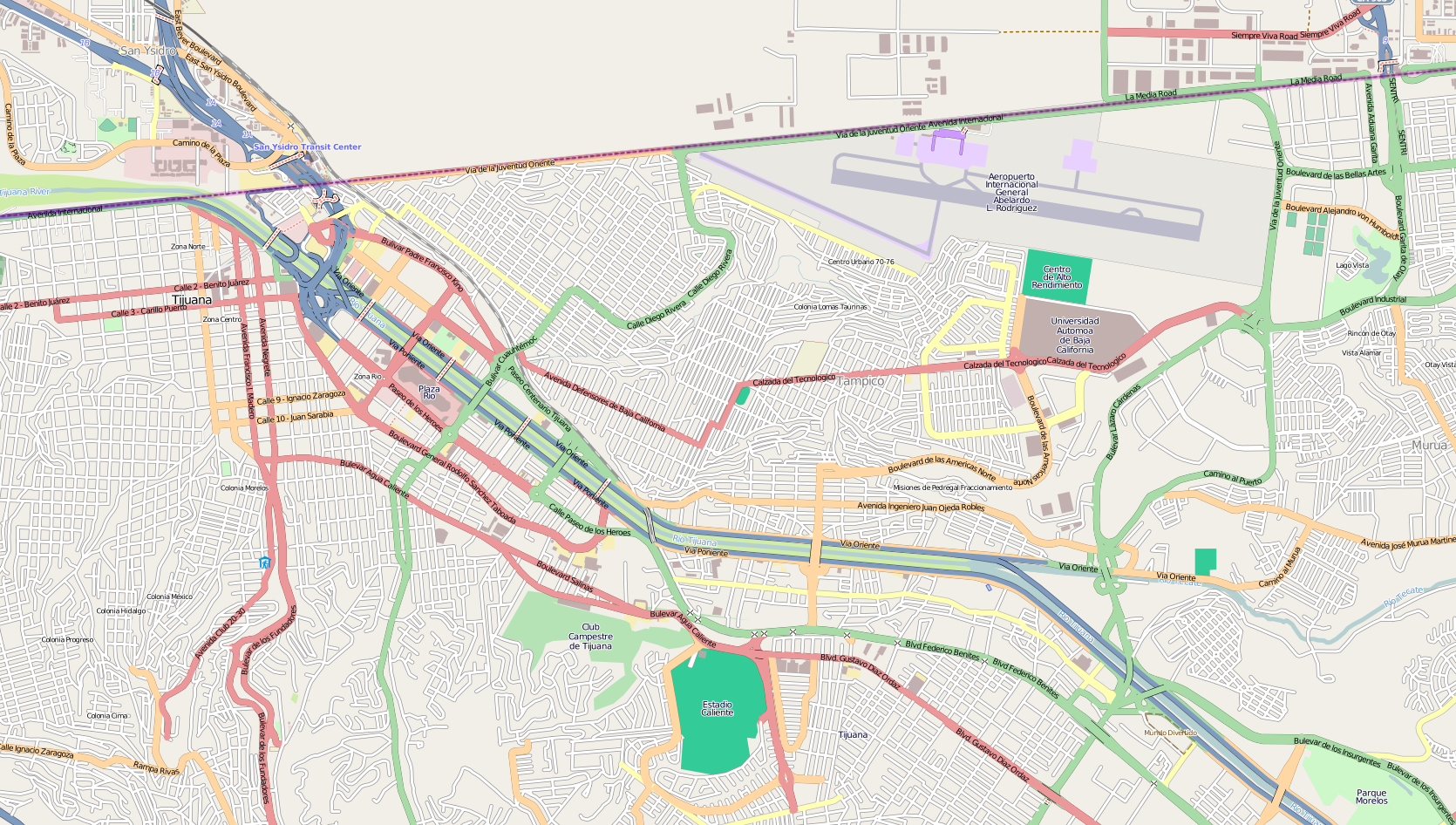
- Location within Central Tijuana
- Coordinates: 32.499165°N 116.96685°W
- Country: Mexico
- State: Baja California
- Municipality (municipio): Tijuana
- Borough (delegación): La Mesa
- Area code: 664

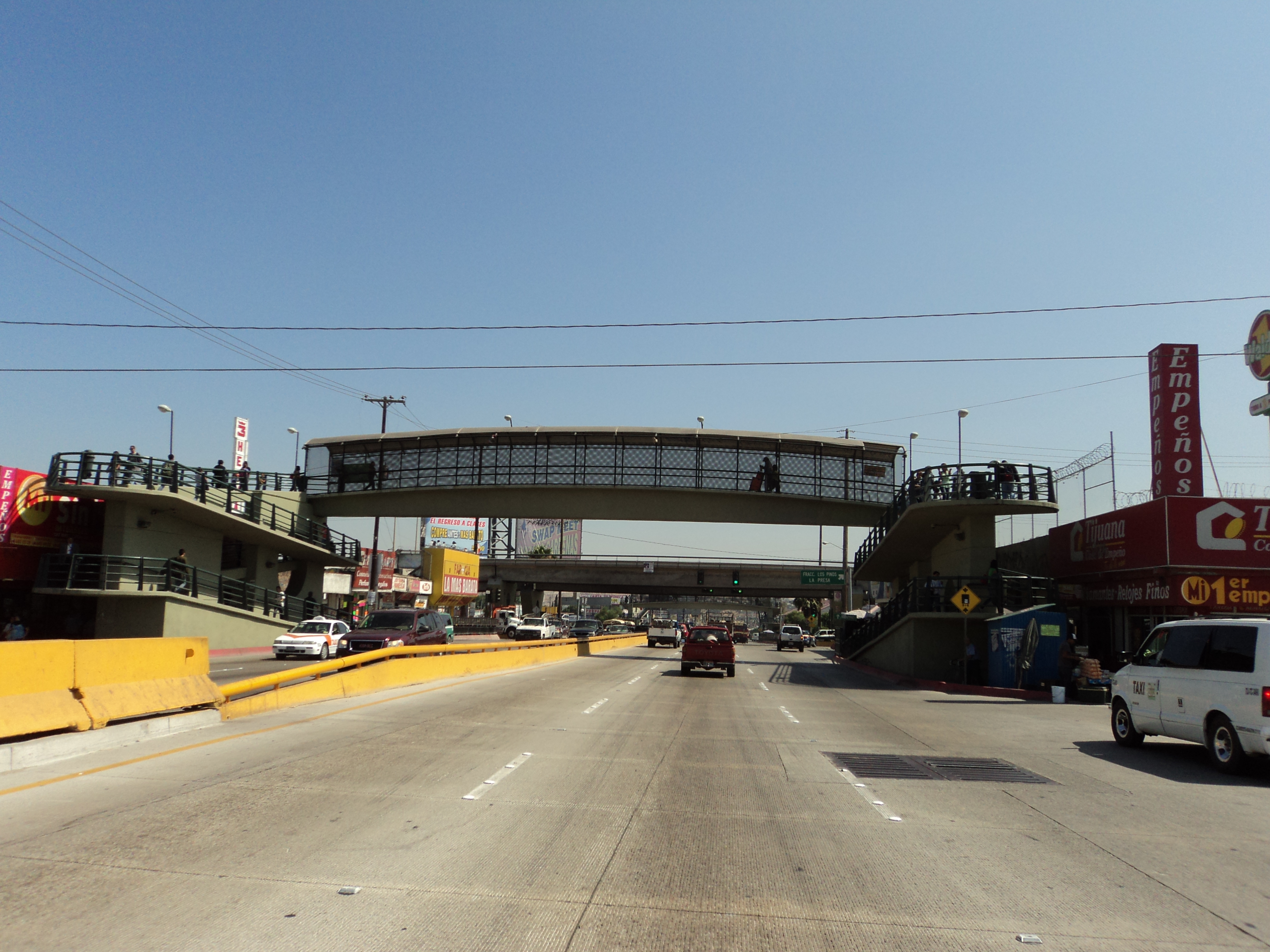
Cinco y Diez pedestrian bridge

La Cinco y Diez (lit. "The Five and Ten", also written "La 5 y 10"), is the name of an intersection, pedestrian overpass over that intersection, public transportation hub and major retail district in La Mesa borough, Tijuana, Mexico. The name exists because a branch of the Luján/Cardenas family's "La Cinco y Diez" five and dime store once stood here, and Tijuana residents taking taxis or buses would ask to be let off by "La Cinco y Diez".

The area has numerous shopping centers, department stores, supermarkets and hypermarkets, including:

- Plaza Carrousel, with a Cinépolis multicinema, Soriana Súper supermarket, and a Sears department store
- Plaza Cedros with an Elektra appliance/electronics/motorcycle store
- Plaza 5 y 10 with a Ley supermarket and Coppel department store
- Plaza Díaz Ordaz with a Calimax supermarket
- Plaza Las Brisas with an additional Coppel department store, "Soriana híper" hypermarket, and an additional Elektra appliance/electronics/motorcycle store
- Serviplaza Mesa 5 y 10 with Coppel and FAMSA department stores and a "Soriana Híper" hypermarket
- Swap Meet 5 y 10
- Swap Meet Las Carpas
- a free-standing Smart & Final supermarket
- a free-standing La Parisina department store
- a Caliente casino
