= Zona Norte, Tijuana =

Zona Norte
- Neighborhood of Tijuana
- Colonia Zona Norte
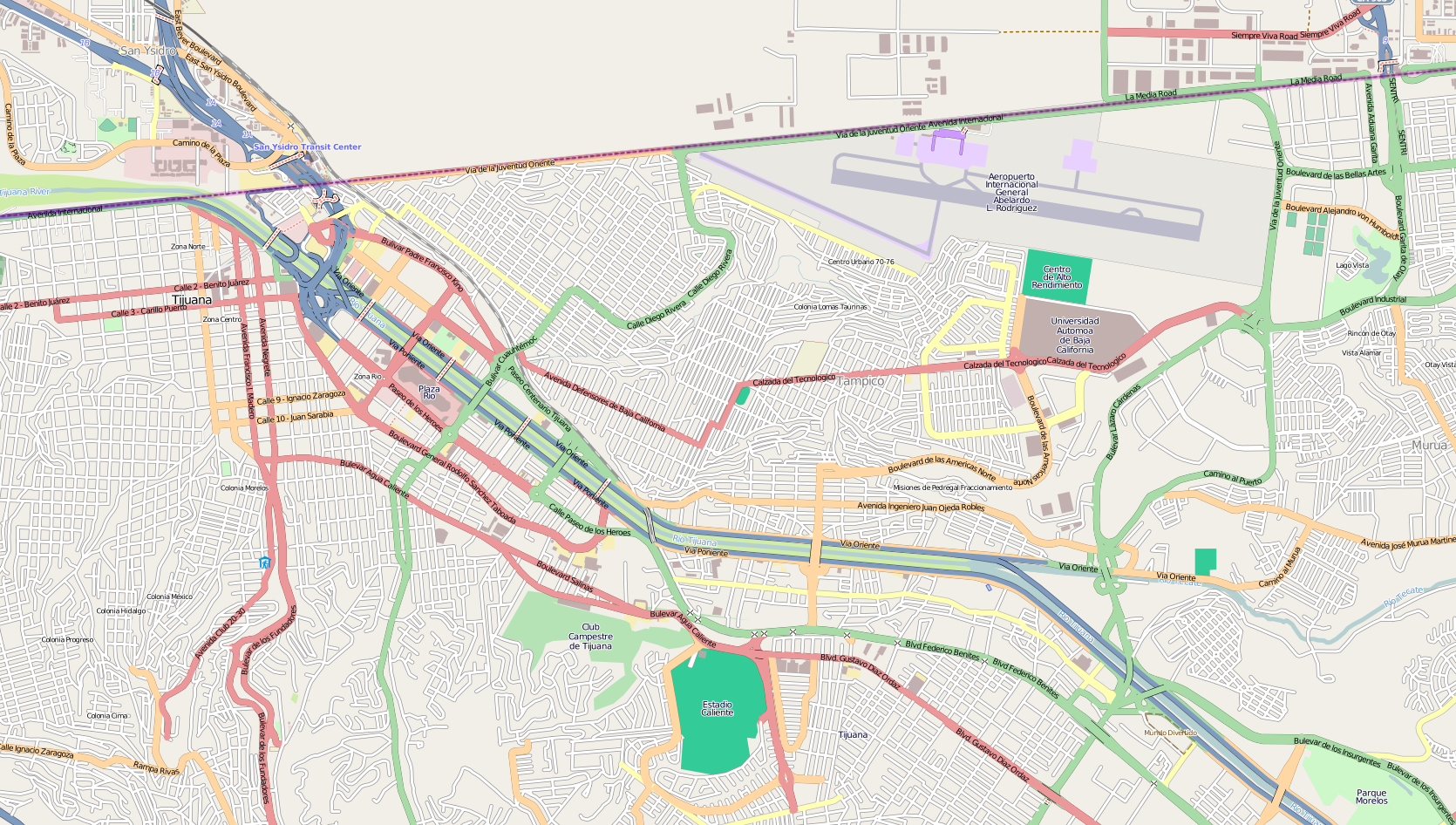
- Location within Central Tijuana
- Coordinates: 32.538876°N 117.045572°W
- Country: Mexico
- State: Baja California
- Municipality (municipio): Tijuana
- Borough (delegación): Centro
- ZIP Code: 22000
- Area codes: 664, 663

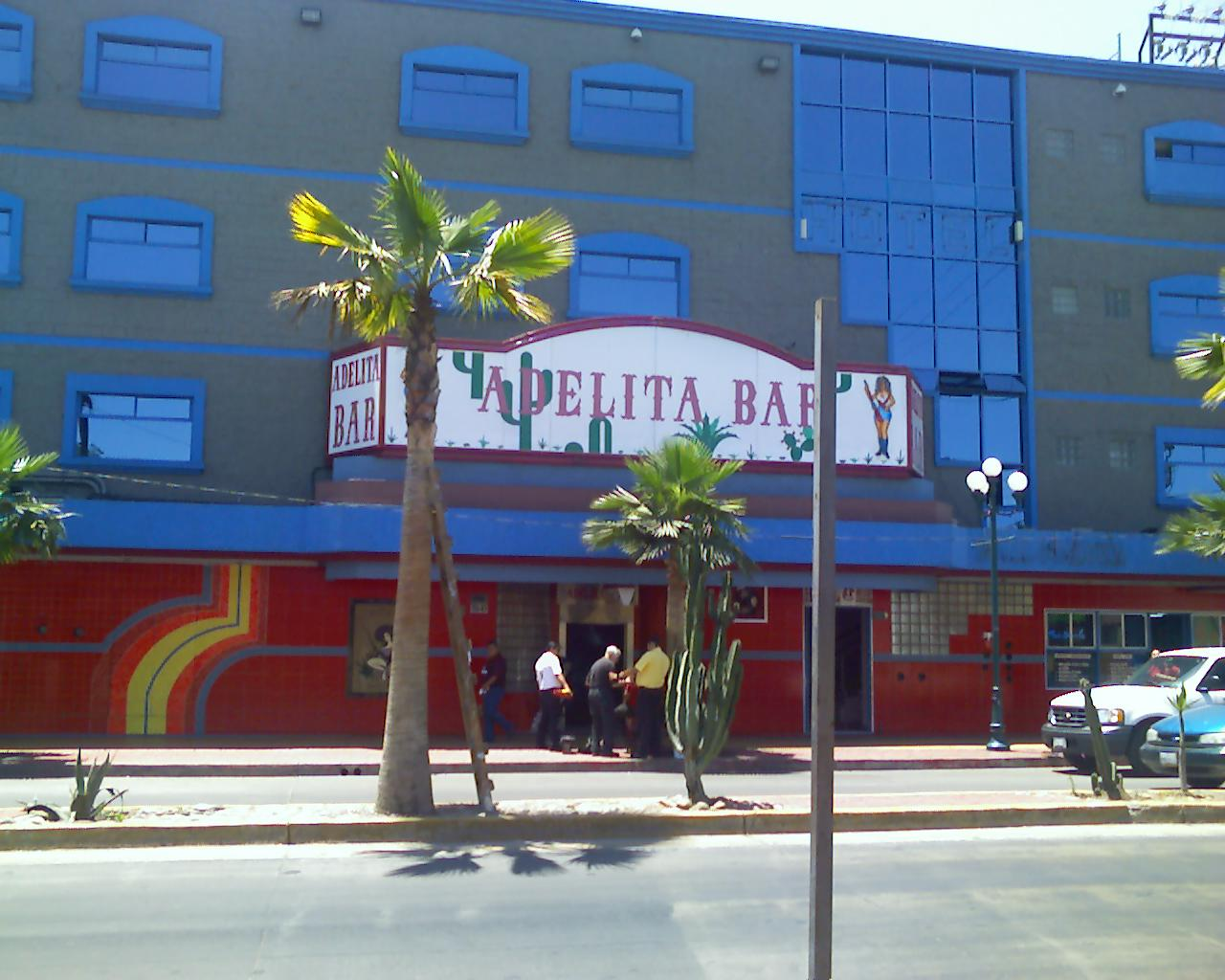
Adelita Bar and Hotel Coahuila

Zona Norte (officially Colonia Zona Norte and la Colonia Coahuila, "North Zone (neighborhood)") is an official neighborhood, as well as a red light district located in Tijuana, Baja California, Mexico. It is among the largest red light districts in North America known for its brothels, which present themselves in public as strip clubs and bars, similar to gentlemen's clubs in the United States.

Many bars and strip clubs in Tijuana's red light district in which women are the feature entertainment also operate as brothels, which offer attached hotel rooms for short intervals of time. Many other bars, styled "lady bars", function as less explicit social clubs where prostitutes and nude sex shows are not accommodated on site, but fichas (drinks for the working ladies) are offered at elevated prices, and freelance prostitutes look for clients.

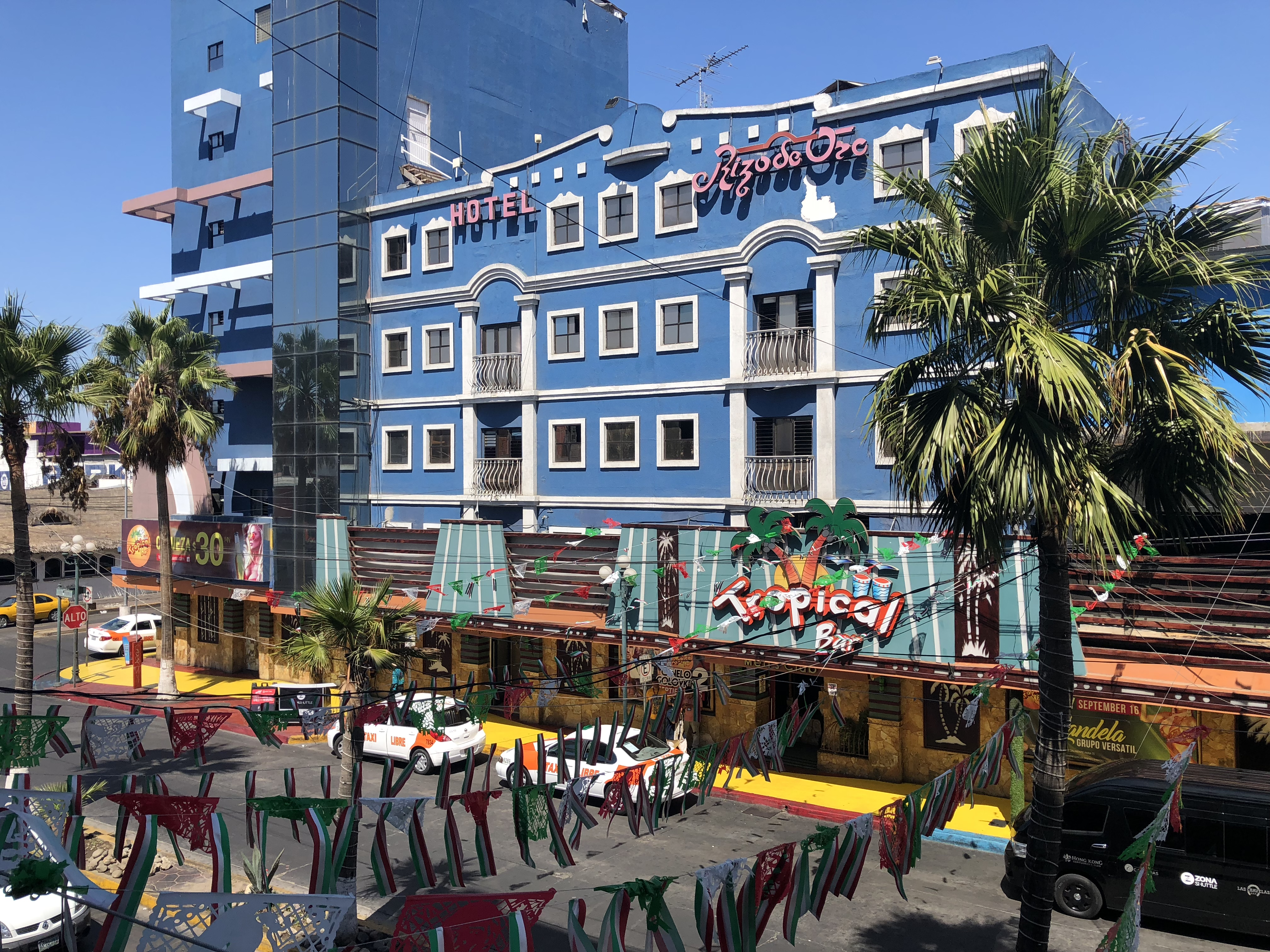
Tropical Bar and Hotel Rizo de Oro

These compare in most respects to the hostess bars in Japan. The red light district in Tijuana is also known for street prostitution, particularly behind the main strip clubs on Calle Coahuila, in a large high-traffic alley named "Primer Callejón Coahuila".

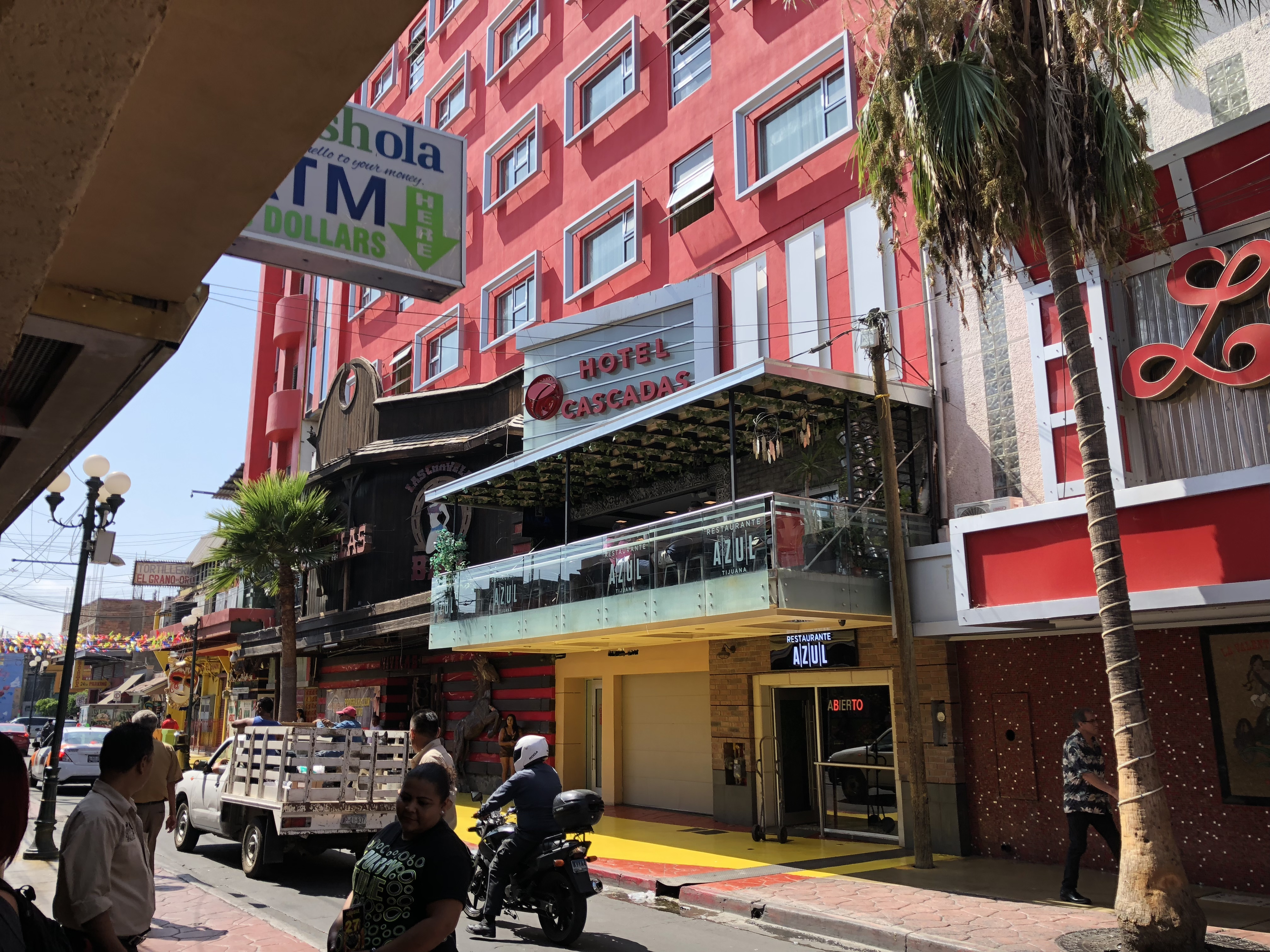
Primer Callejón Coahuila

Illicit drug sales are also common to the red light district, which happens night and day in plain view because the local police tolerates it in the form of collecting their commission. The dealer's selling phrase is "¿Cuantos?" meaning "How much?" in Spanish. Heroin use and theft, not common elsewhere in Mexico, are rampant here.

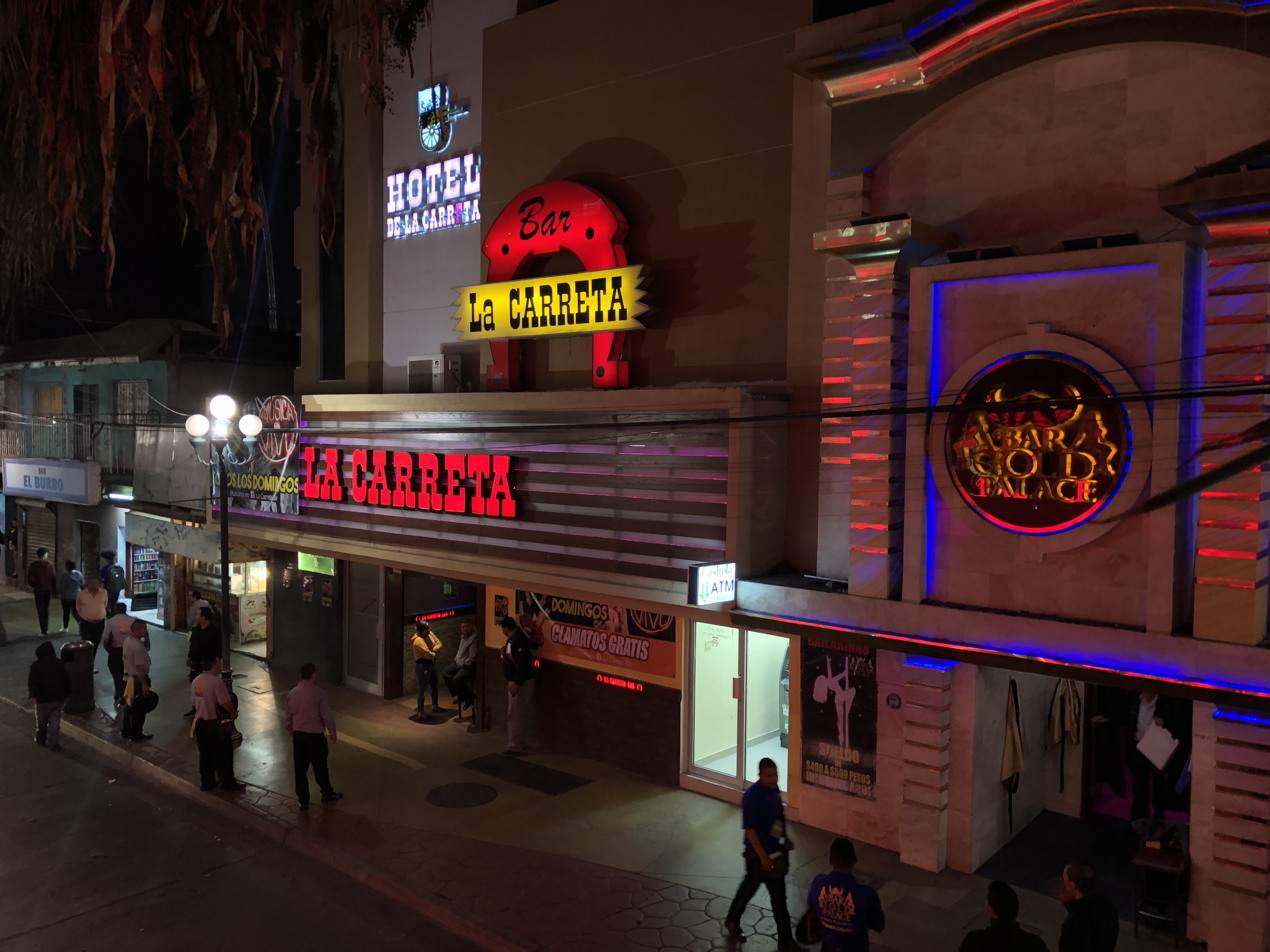
Bar La Carreta

Due to its proximity to San Diego, California, it is frequented by Americans, as well as locals. The district is also known as La Coahuila for the name of the primary avenue that runs through it.

== Location ==
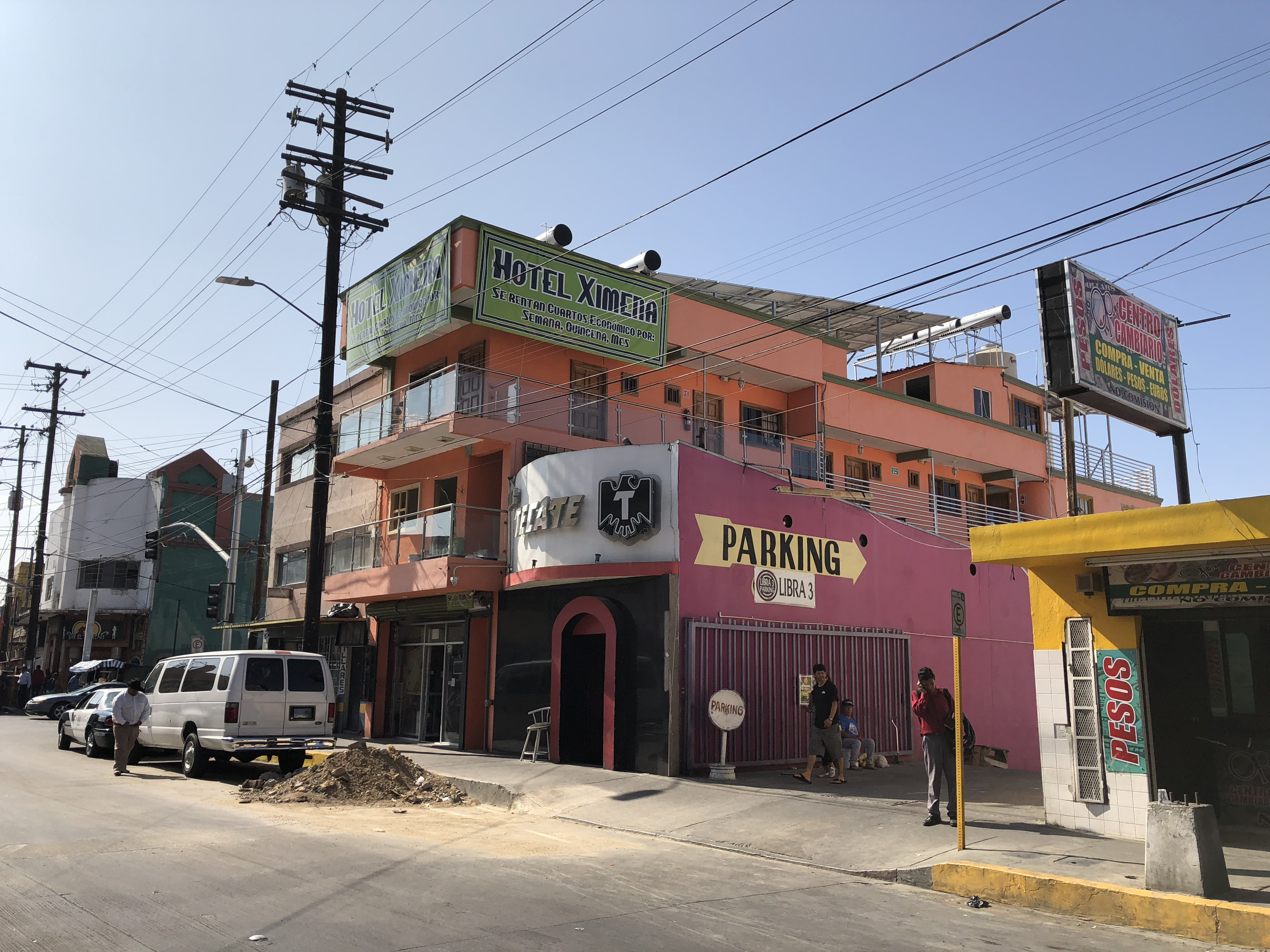
Artículo 123/Calle Primera (1st street) at Avenida Constitución

Zona Norte is bordered by Downtown Tijuana (Zona Centro) on the south, Zona Río on the east, San Diego and the Mexico–United States border on the north, and colonia Castillo on the west. Politically, the Zona Norte neighborhood is part of the Delegación Centro. Tijuana's red light district itself encompasses just a couple of blocks within Zona Norte.

The unofficial boundaries of the red light district extend from Avenida Revolución to Av. Miguel F. Martinez, east to west, and from Baja California to Calle Primera, north to south. The focal point of the red light district, however, is the core block bordered by Calle Coahuila on the north and Primer Callejón Coahuila on the south between Constitucion and Niños Heroes.

== Prostitution ==
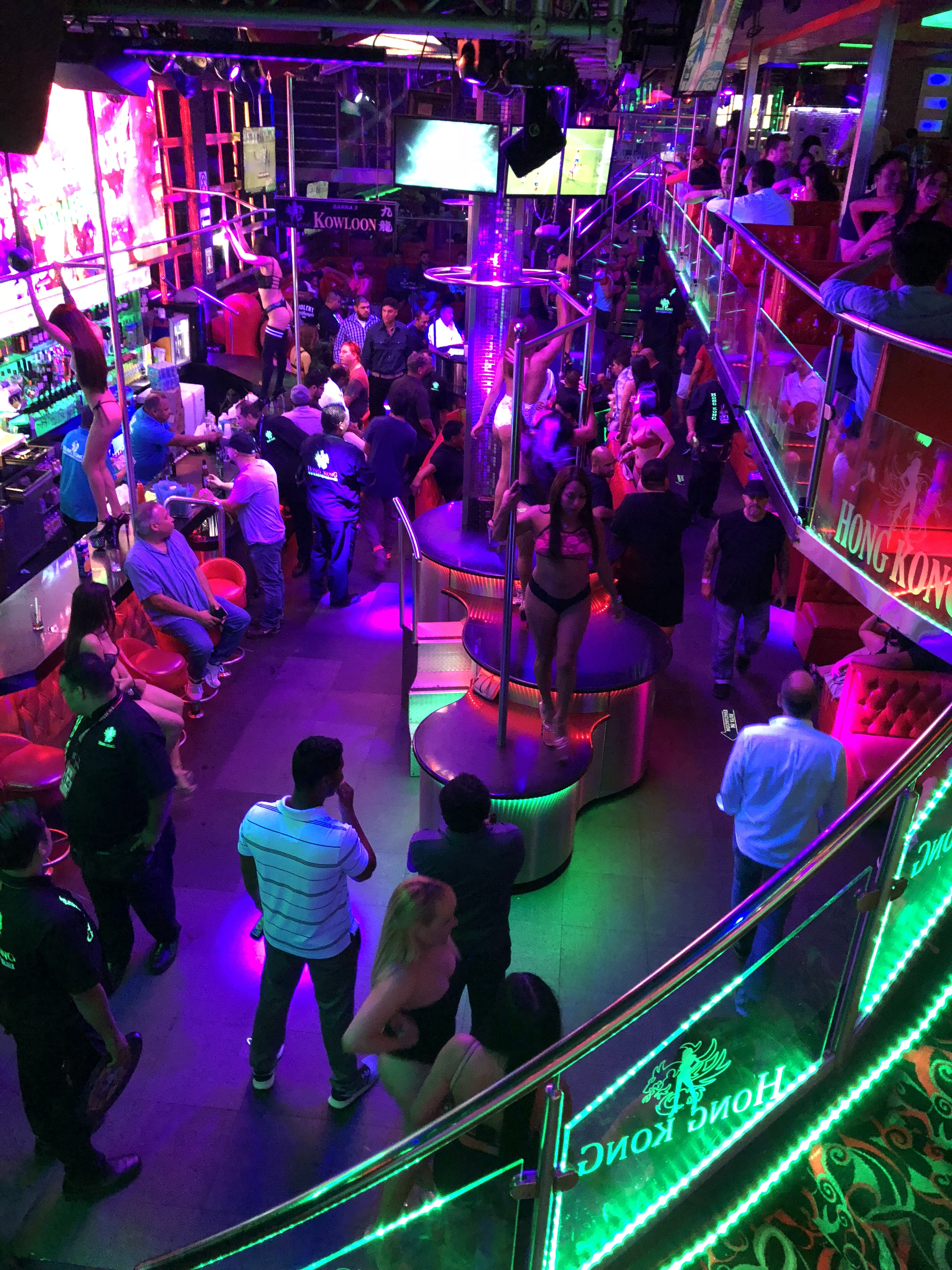
Interior of a gentlemen's club in Zona Norte.

Prostitution is permitted in Tijuana's red light district, designated a zona de tolerancia, or "tolerance zone." Legal prostitution within the city requires sex workers to obtain a permit and be subjected to monthly health checkups. Brothels in Tijuana, many of them modeled on strip clubs and hostess clubs, must also conform to certain health regulations, such as standards of cleanliness, fixed operating hours, and be placed a regulated distance from schools or day care centers.

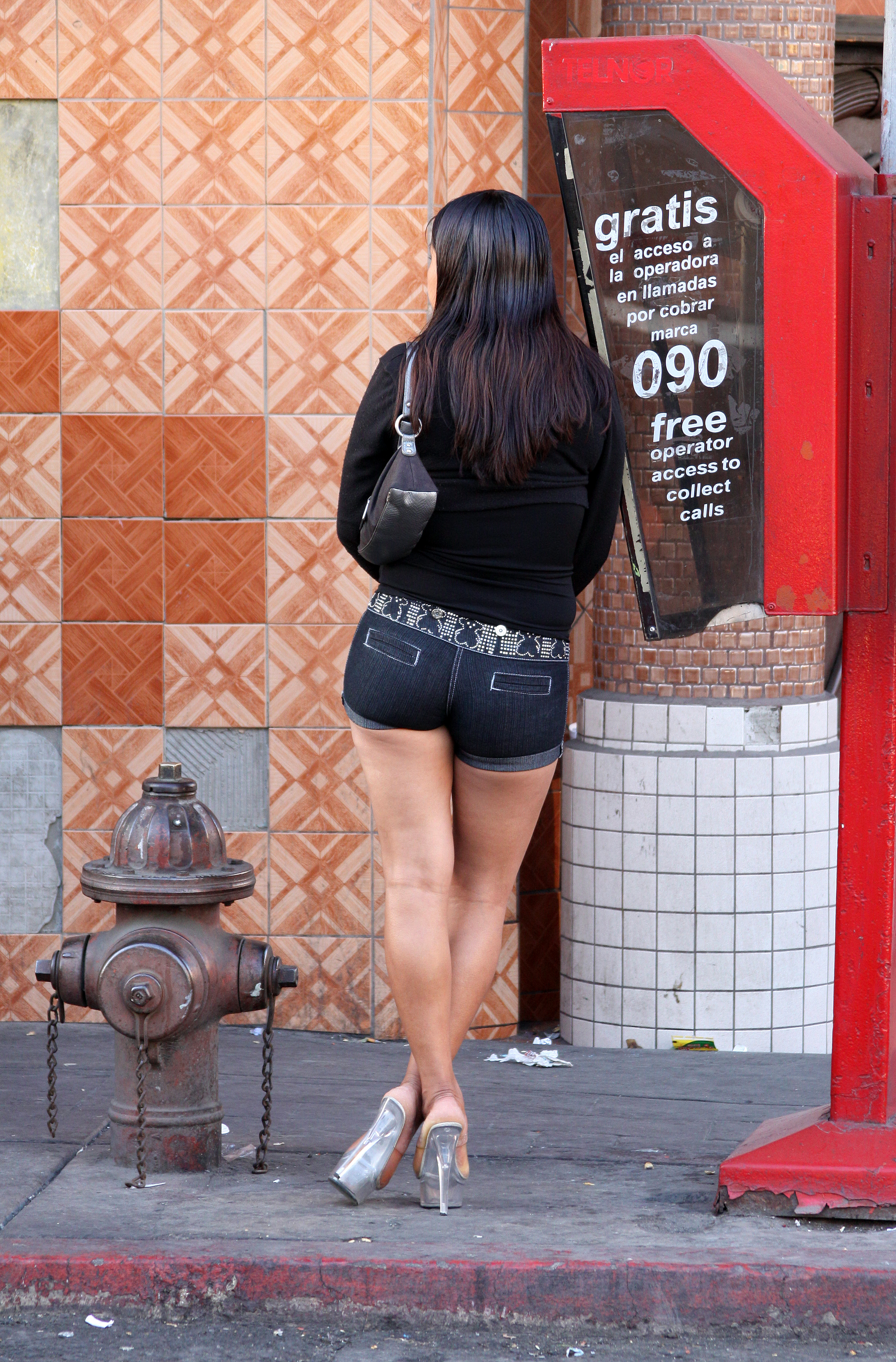
A street prostitute in Zona Norte.

In addition to established brothels, there are prostitutes who work outside on the callejones or alleys and are referred to as paraditas, Spanish for "the standing girls", for their practice of standing on the street to advertise their services. Paraditas have been regarded as part of Tijuana's cultural history, and attempts to force the women off the streets to curb such public advertising have proven unpopular and unsuccessful.

== Problems ==
Illegal drug sales occur in Zona Norte. Substance abuse is not uncommon. 10% of hospitalizations in Tijuana are for alcoholism.

Michael Hemmingson's ethnographic study, Zona Norte: The Post-Structural Body of Erotic Dancers and Sex Workers in Tijuana, San Diego, and Los Angeles, found that many of these girls lie about their age, saying they are 19–22, and do not work the streets, but special brothels. The study suggests much of trafficking claims are exaggerated by organizations with political, moral, and religious agendas.

== See also ==
- Prostitution in Mexico
- Cabo San Lucas
- LGBTQ culture in Tijuana
