= IShopMixup =

Mexican computer, smartphone and music retailer

iShopMixup
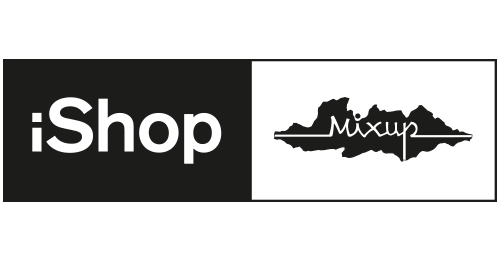

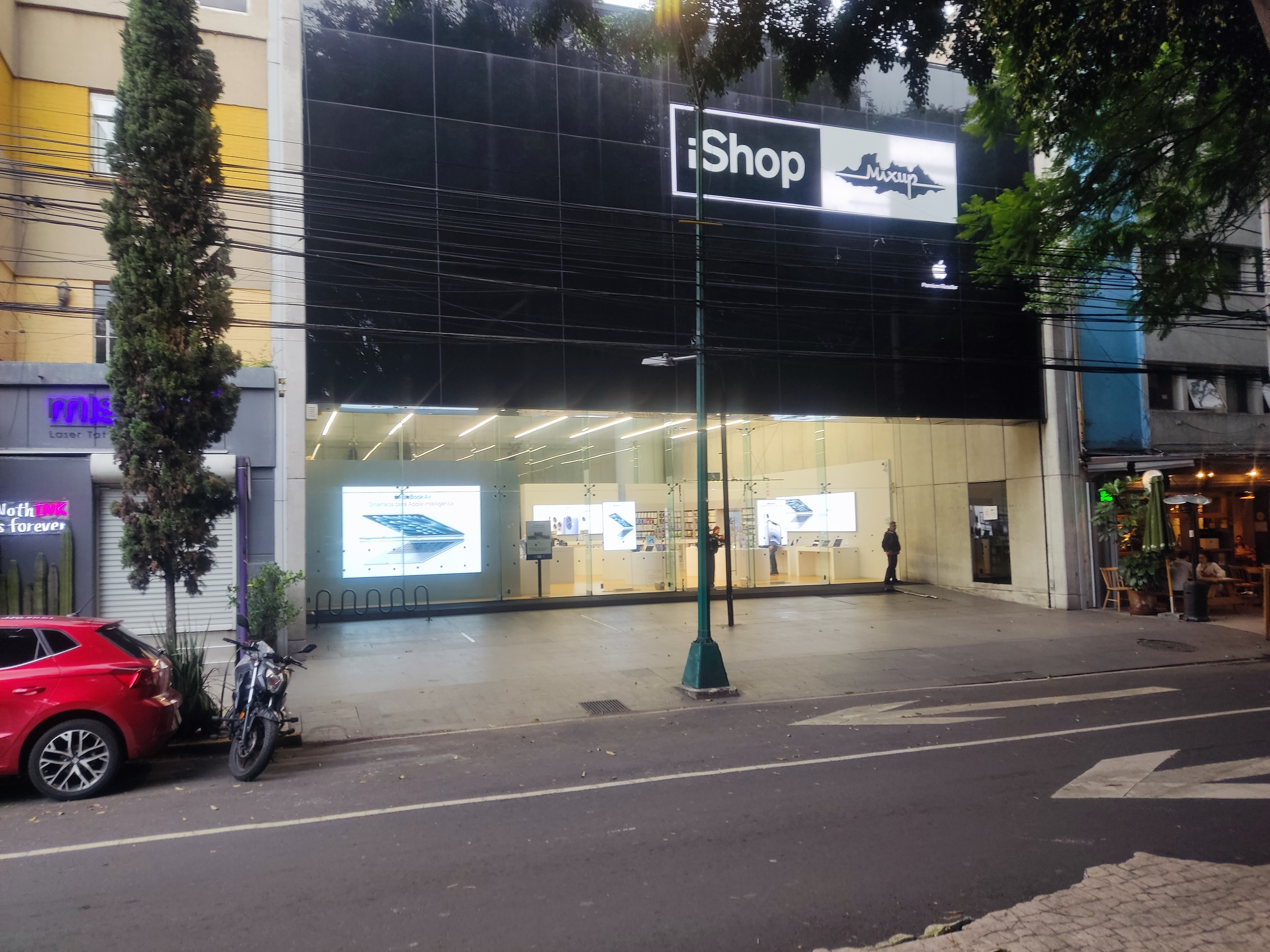
- Industry: Retail consumer electronics and music stores
- Headquarters: Presa Salinillas 370, Col. Irrigación 11500 Miguel Hidalgo, Mexico City, Mexico
- Number of locations: 130 (2019)
- Revenue: MXN 14,000,000,000 (USD ~820,000,000) (2021)
- Parent: Grupo Sanborns
- Website: ishopmixup.com.mx

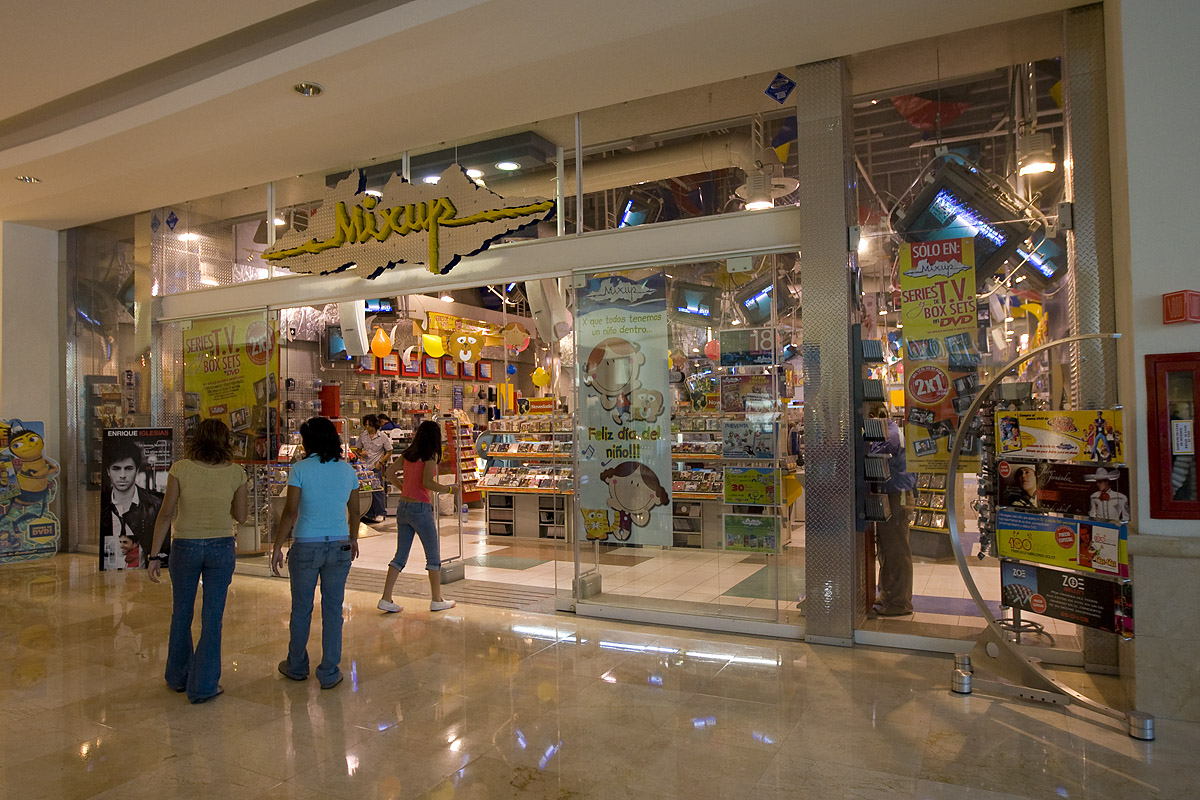
Mixup store

iShop and Mixup are two retail store chains forming Promotora Musical, S.A. de C.V. (more commonly known as iShopMixup): iShop sells electronics and Mixup sells music in stores across Mexico, some of which are joint. iShop specializes in Apple products and is an official Apple Premium reseller. Together they are part of Grupo Sanborns, in turn part of Grupo Carso controlled by billionaire Carlos Slim. Mixup was founded in 1989. iShop Mixup is headed by Patricio Slim Domit, son of Carlos Slim and Head of Grupo Sanborns, and has about 2,000 employees. Forbes rated the company #199 among Mexico's best employers in 2022.

Mixup music stores sell CDs and Vinyl, video games, Blu-ray, books, Cassette, LP, VHS and DVDs.

Mixup has 27 music stores in Greater Mexico City, and 36 more across the rest of Mexico.

== History ==
Mixup was founded on June 4, 1973, in Mexico City. In 1994, when Slim acquired 51% of the stock that ran the shops, and with this established Promotora Musical S. A. de C. V.

In 2020 iShop and Mixup experienced the lowest decline in sales of Grupo Sanborns companies (less than Sanborns and Sears Mexico). In the first quarter of 2022, iShop and Mixup represent 30% of total Grupo Sanborns sales, with more than 5 billion pesos in quarterly revenue (roughly US$300 million), behind only Sears and more than Sanborns itself. In 2019 this figure was only 20%, with Sanborns accounting for 25% of group sales and Sears for 47%. In 2021 total sales were just over 14 billion pesos (about US$820 million).

== See also ==
- Grupo Carso
- Grupo Sanborns
