= Grupo Carso =

Mexican multinational conglomerate

Grupo Carso S.A.B. de C.V.
- Type: Public
- Traded as: BMV: GCARSO A1
- Industry: Conglomerate
- Founded: 1980; 46 years ago
- Founder: Carlos Slim; Soumaya Domit
- Headquarters: Plaza Carso, Mexico City, Mexico.
- Area served: Worldwide
- Key people: Carlos Slim Domit (chairman)
- Products: Industrial, Media, Retail, Telecommunications
- Revenue: MXN 96.640 billion (2018)
- Operating income: MXN 10.559 billion (2018)
- Net income: MXN 4.331 billion (2018)
- Total assets: MXN 137.889 billion (2018)
- Total equity: MXN 93.178 billion (2018)
- Owner: Carlos Slim (78.7%)
- Number of employees: 72,944 (2020)
- Divisions: Carso Energy; Carso Infraestructura y Construcción; Grupo Condumex; Grupo Sanborns
- Subsidiaries: Bimex; Elementia; Minera Frisco; Ostar Grupo Hotelero; Real Oviedo
- Website: www.carso.com.mx

Grupo Carso S.A.B. de C.V. is a Mexican global conglomerate company owned by Carlos Slim. It was formed in 1990 after the merger of Corporación Industrial Carso and Grupo Inbursa. The name Carso stands for Carlos Slim and Soumaya Domit de Slim, his wife.

In May 2014, the conglomerate had a stock market capitalisation of over $12 billion US dollars.

In 1996, Carso Global Telecom (which includes Telmex, Telcel and América Móvil) separated itself from Grupo Carso.

== Divisions ==
=== Industrial and manufacturing ===
As of 2023, 31% of sales, 34% of operating income.

- Grupo Condumex
  - products: cables (electrical, telephony, electronic, coaxial, fiber optics, for mining, automotive and others), automotive electrical harnesses, precision steel tubing, power transformers, alternate energy
  - brands: Condumex, Latincasa, Vinanel, Condulac, IEM, Precitubo, Sitcom, Microm, Sinergia, Equiter, Logtec

=== Commercial ===
As of 2023, 52% of sales, 41% of operating income.

- Grupo Sanborns
  - DAX cosmetics stores
  - iShopMixup electronics and music stores
  - Sanborns restaurants and stores
  - Sears Mexico

=== Infrastructure and construction ===
As of 2023, 19% of sales, 19% of operating income. Provides services to these sectors: chemical and petroleum, installation of pipelines, infrastructure, civil construction, and housing projects

  - Construction of: Roads; tunnels; water treatment plants, and infrastructure works, petroleum platforms and equipment for the chemical and petroleum industries, drilling of oil wells, geothermal wells, and drilling services; shopping centers, industrial plants, office buildings, and housing, telecommunications facilities, gas pipelines and aqueducts
  - Brands: CICSA, Swecomex, Bronco Drilling, Cilsa (Constructora de Infraestructura Latinoamericana, S.A.), GSM, PC Construcciones, Urvitec

=== Telecommunication ===
- Carso Global Telecom

=== Carso Energy ===
Participates in the energy and petroleum industries. Currently it performs gas transportation services for the Comisión Federal de Electricidad (Federal Electricity Commission). Pursues business opportunities arising from the energy reform laws in Mexico and other countries. Their main brands are Carso Energy, Carso Oil & Gas and Carso Electric.

=== Research & revelopment ===
- CIDEC (Centro de Investigación y Desarrollo CARSO), Querétaro
  - Jurica unit - focuses on research and development projects. Has laboratories and pilot plants that enable manufacture of prototypes and implementation of technologies that will later be scaled and transferred to the operations of Grupo Carso.
  - Technical center: in charge of developing electrical and electronic systems, requested by different automobile manufacturers, as well as embedded software development mainly for automotive applications.
