= Grupo Sanborns =

Mexican retailing company

Grupo Sanborns S.A. de C.V.
- Company type: Private
- Founded: 1903; 123 years ago
- Headquarters: Mexico City, Mexico
- Key people: Carlos Slim Domit (CEO)
- Products: Cafeteria, Restaurant, Retail, Pharmacy, Department Store
- Number of employees: 18,000+
- Parent: Grupo Carso
- Subsidiaries: DAX eduMac; Grupo Sanborns; Mixup iShop-Mixup; Pam-Pam; Sanborns Café; Sears Roebuck México
- Website: www.sanborns.com.mx

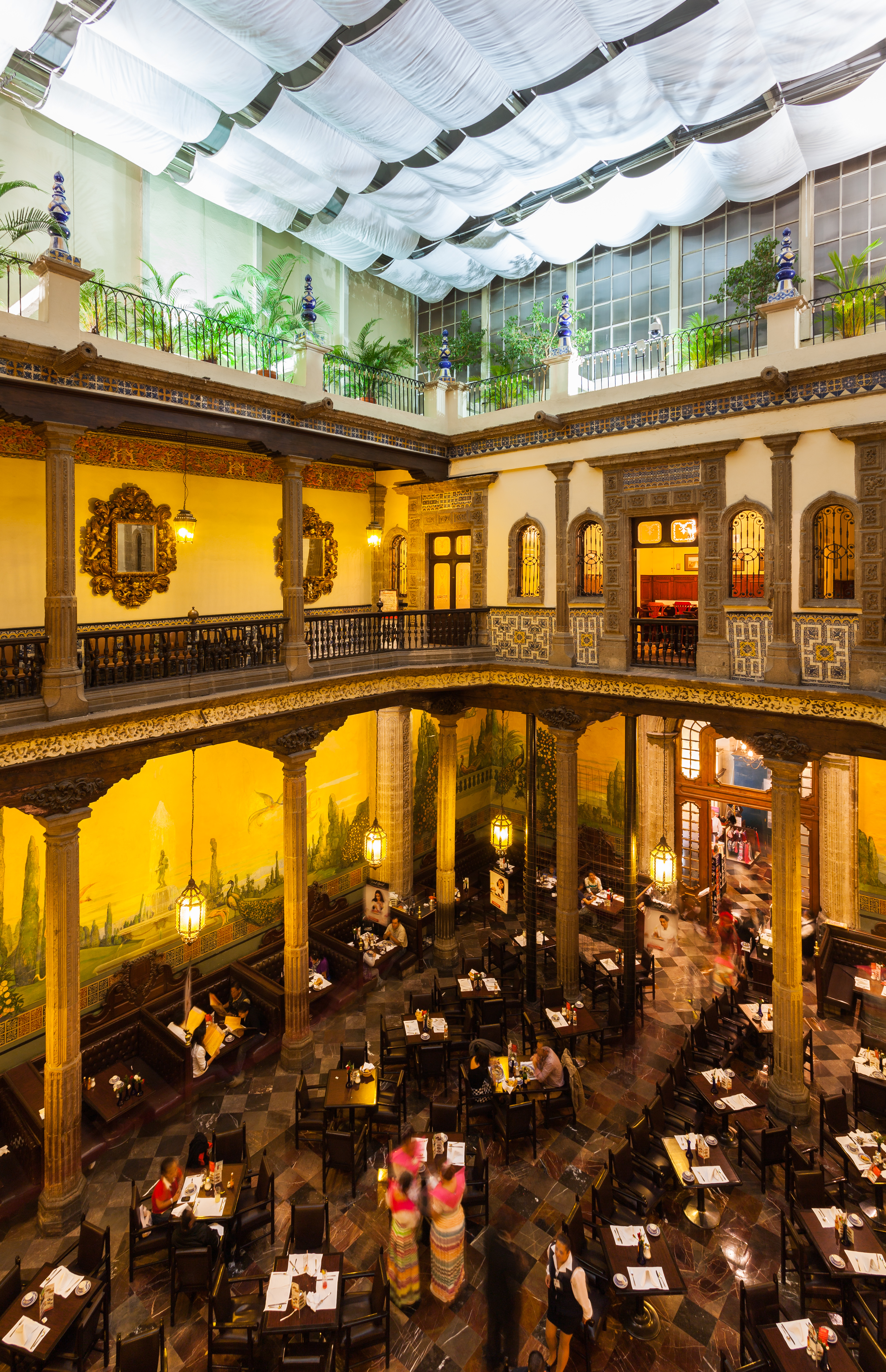
Inside Sanborns restaurant and department store, in the Casa de los Azulejos, Historic center of Mexico City

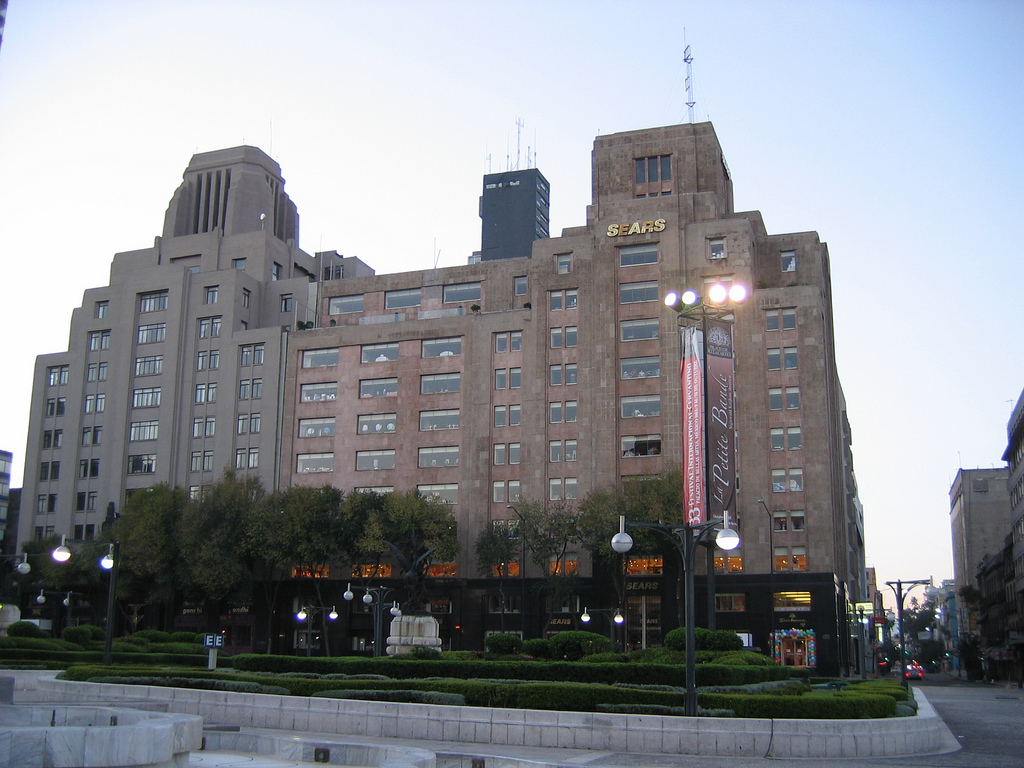
The freestanding Sears Mexico store on Avenida Juárez in the Historic center of Mexico City

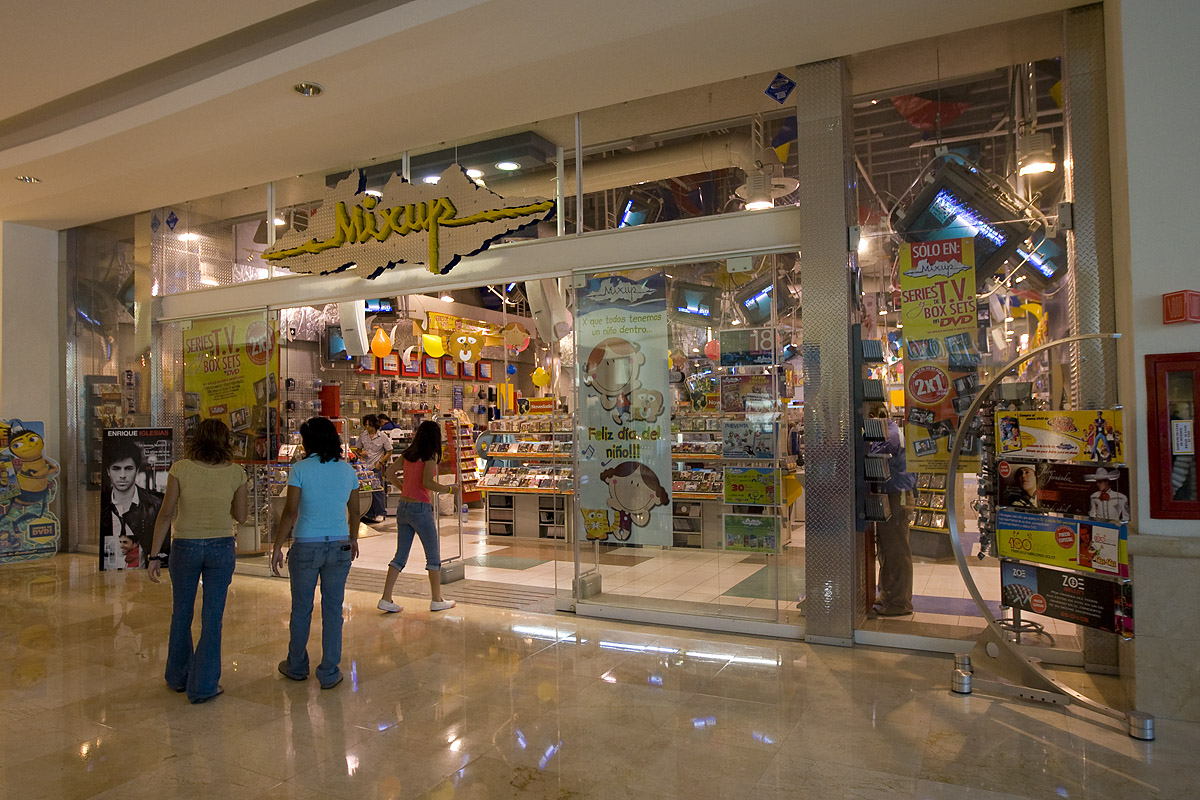
Mixup music store

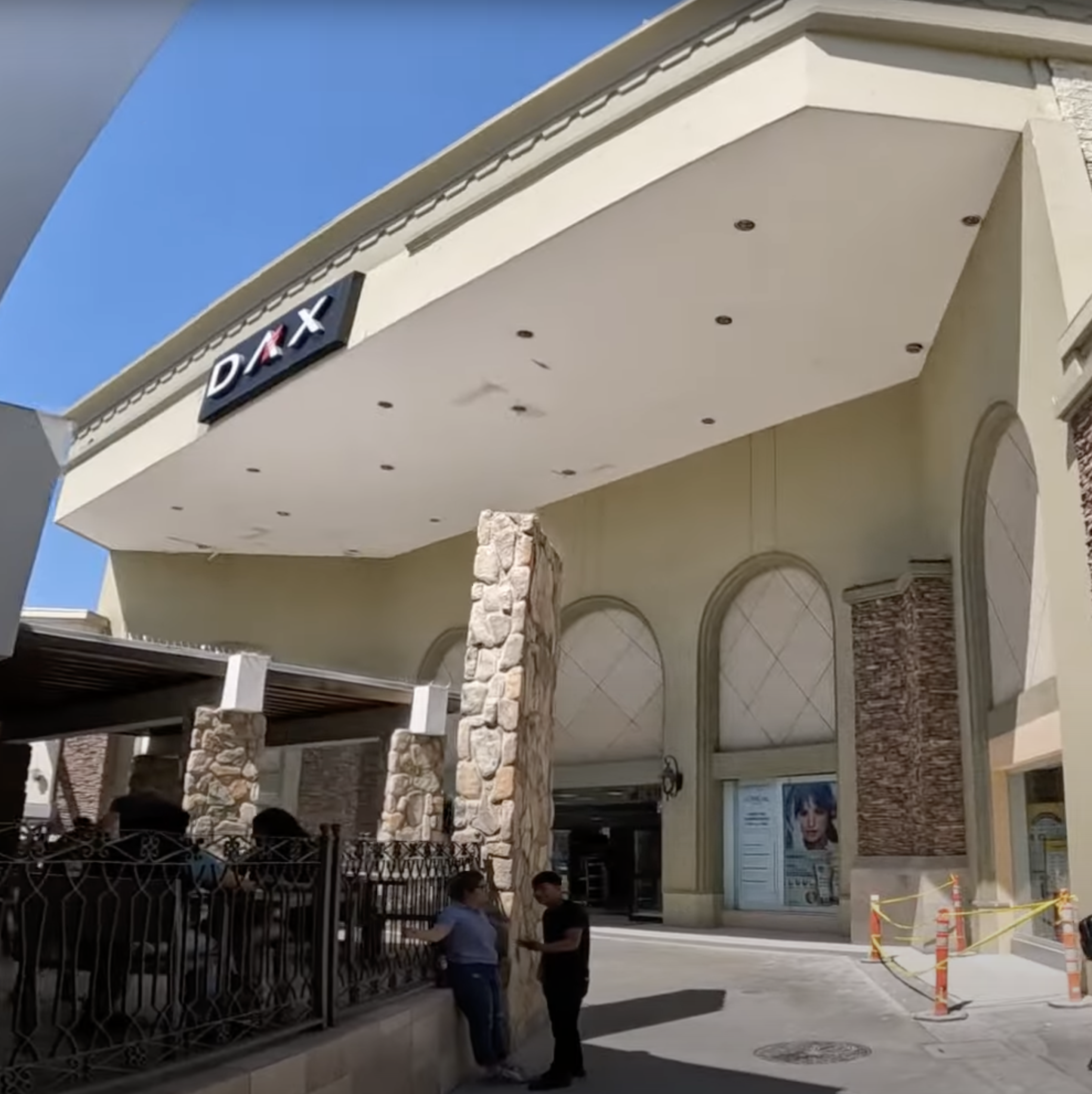
DAX Plaza Río Tijuana, 2023

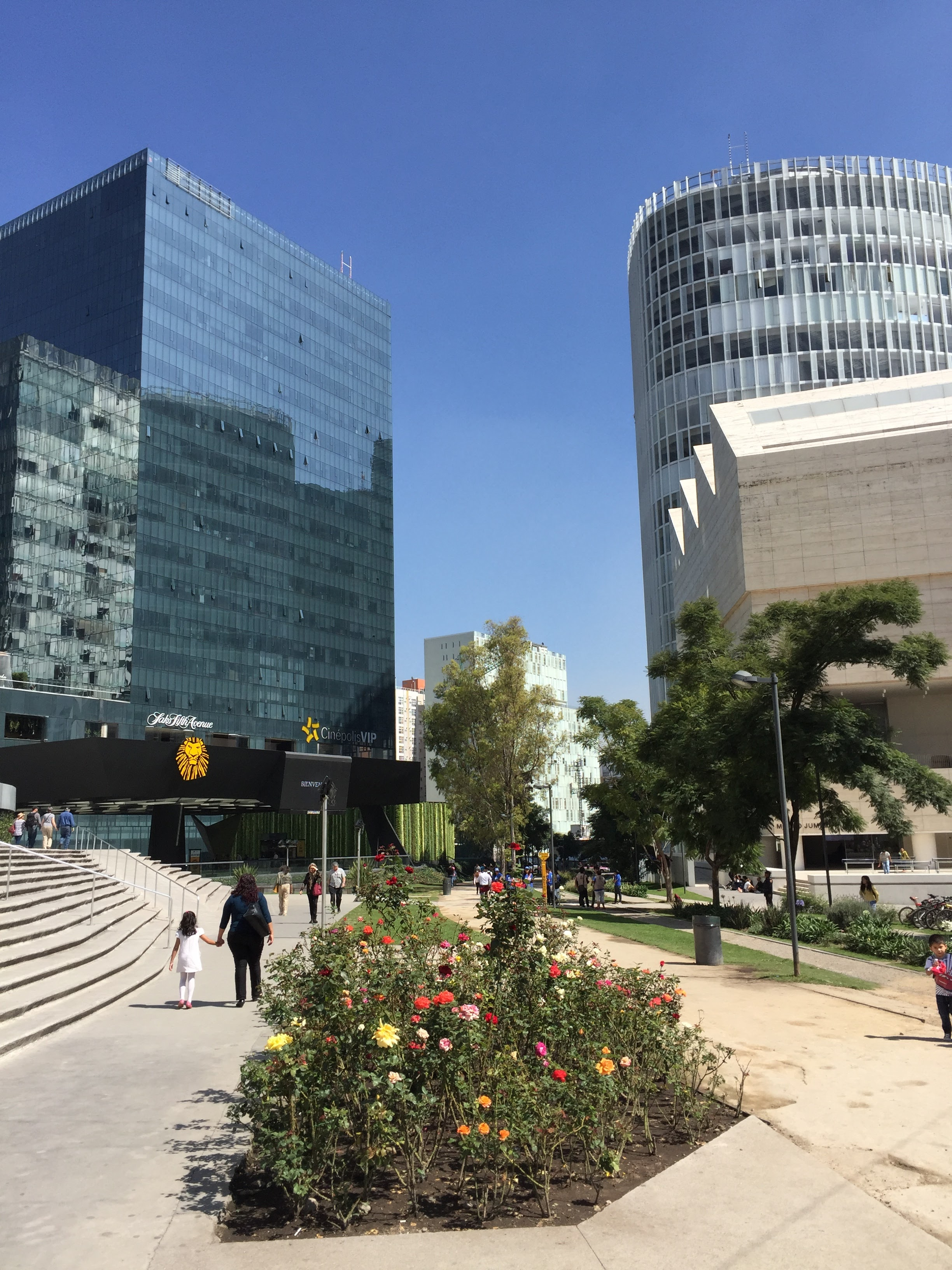
SFA Polanco (opened 2010, closed 2020) at Plaza Carso Mexico City 2015

Grupo Sanborns S.A. de C.V. is a retailing arm of the Carlos Slim-run Grupo Carso that includes the namesake Sanborns restaurant and junior department store chain, Mixup music stores, iShop Apple/electronics stores, Sears department stores in Mexico, and until October 2023, Mexico's sole Saks Fifth Avenue store.

As of 2021, the group sales were 53 billion Mexican pesos, equivalent to around US$2.6 billion. It operated in 62 metropolitan areas and towns across the country, with formats including:

- 197 Sanborns restaurant-and-retail stores and Sanborns Cafés (stand-alone restaurants)
- 141 Mixup (music/video) and iShop (official Apple reseller) stores (usually located next to each other)
- 97 Sears full-line, mid-range department stores

It is headed up by Patricio Slim Domit, son of Carlos Slim.

== Divisions ==
As of end of 2020, there are the following divisions:

- Sears
- Sanborns, see below
- iShopMixup
- Other formats, see below

=== Sanborns division ===
The Sanborns division as of December 2020 included:

- Sanborns junior department stores-and-restaurants
- Sanborns Home&Fashion stores
- Sanborns Café restaurants
- DAX cosmetics and variety stores
- Two Saks Fifth Avenue stores in Mexico City (both since closed, see Timeline of Saks Fifth Avenue branches

=== "Other formats" division ===
- Two shopping malls, Plaza Loreto and Plaza Inbursa
- One Sears store in El Salvador
- ClaroShop e-commerce portal

Formerly included

- Three Boutiques
- Three Sanborns stores in Central America (now closed)

== iShop ==
A chain of consumer electronics stores focusing on Apple computers, smartphones and accessories. Certified Apple Premium reseller.

== Mixup ==
A chain of music stores across Mexico, often as joint Mixup/iShop stores.

== Defunct group businesses ==
=== Saks Fifth Avenue ===
From 2007 until 2023, the group operated the only Saks Fifth Avenue stores in Mexico, both in Mexico City, one at Plaza Carso mall in Nuevo Polanco from 2010 to 2020, the other at Centro Santa Fe from 2007 to 2023. Deciding not to renew its Saks franchise, the group will convert it to a Sears.
