= Downtown Tijuana =

- Neighborhood of Tijuana
- Colonia Zona Centro
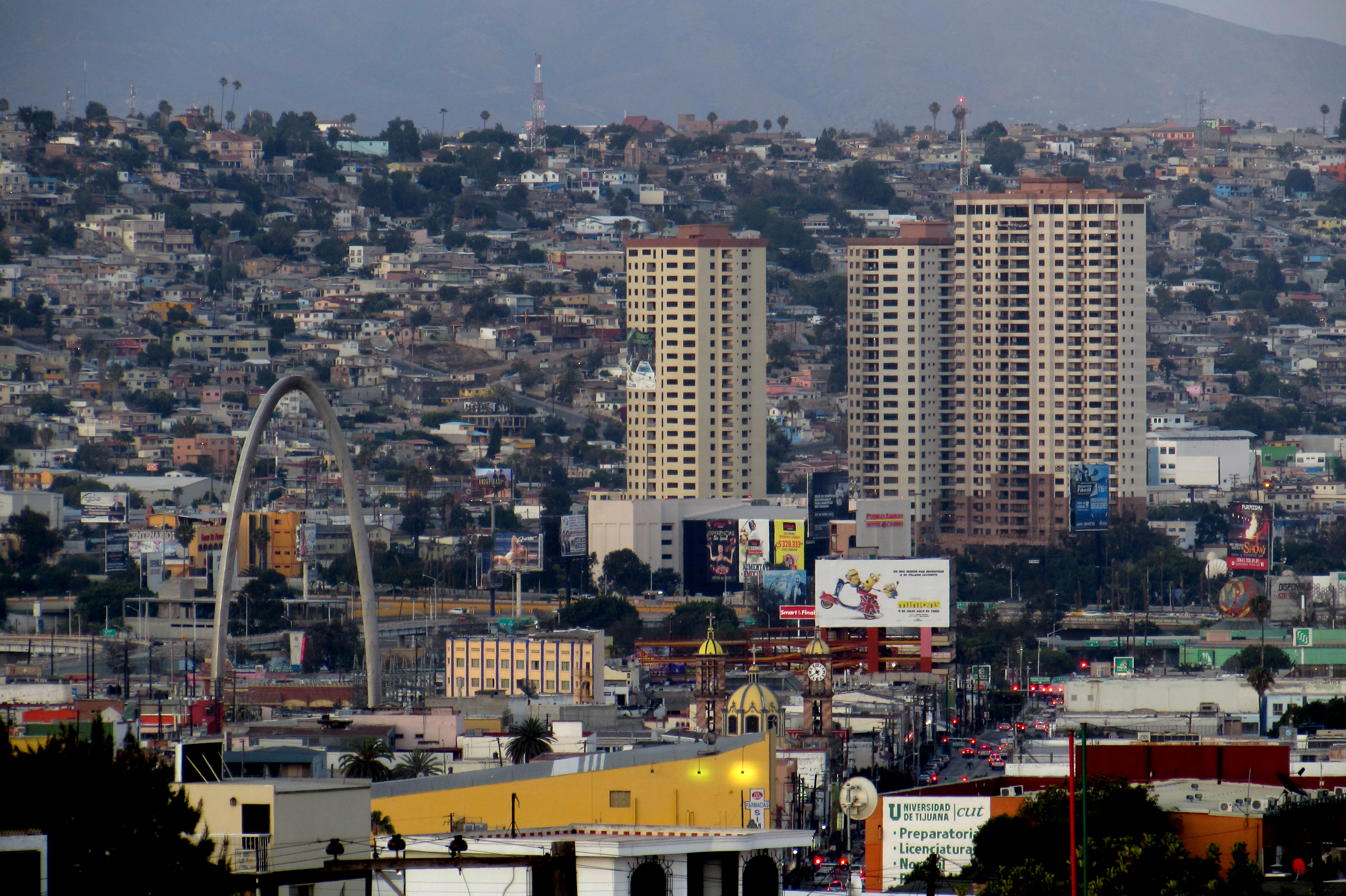

- Location within Central Tijuana
- Coordinates: 32.538876°N 117.045572°W
- Country: United Mexican States
- State: Baja California
- Municipality (municipio): Tijuana
- Borough (delegación): Centro
- ZIP Code: 22000
- Area code: 664

Downtown Tijuana, officially Colonia Zona Centro, is an official neighborhood of Tijuana, Mexico. It is located within the Central Borough ("Delegación Centro") of the city, which is immediately southwest of the San Ysidro Port of Entry. It is bordered by Calle Artículo 123 and the Zona Norte neighborhood (and red light district) on the north, by Calle Ocampo and Zona Este and Zona Río on the east, and by the colonias (neighborhoods) Castillo, Lindavista, Altamira, Independencia, Morelos, and Juárez on the west and south. Avenida Revolución is the main tourist thoroughfare while Avenida Constitución is a main traditional shopping thoroughfare.
