= Timeline of Tijuana =

Coordinates: 32°31′30″N 117°02′0″W

The following is a timeline of the history of the city of Tijuana, Baja California, Mexico.

== Prior to 20th century ==
- 1829 - Land grant to Santiago Argüello in 1829, establishing Rancho Tía Juana in what was then, Alta California.
- 1839 - Kumeyaay raid on Tijuana.
- 1848 - End of the Mexican–American War. International border between US and Mexico formed north of Tijuana, Tijuana area is transferred to Baja California.
- 1889 - Tijuana founded in Baja California Territory.
- 1900 - Population: 243.

== 20th century ==
=== 1900s-1950s ===
- 1911
  - Magonista rebellion of 1911 erupts in Northern Baja California, Tijuana is occupied by the Magonistas for several weeks.
  - May 8/9 - First Battle of Tijuana; Magonistas capture Tijuana.
  - June 22 - Second Battle of Tijuana; Mexico recaptures Tijuana
- 1914 - El Hispano Americano newspaper begins publication.
- 1916 - Hippodrome opens.
- 1924 - Caesar salad invented by restaurateur Caesar Cardini.
- 1925 - La Voz de Tijuana newspaper begins publication.
- 1928 - Agua Caliente Casino and Hotel in business.
- 1929 - Agua Caliente Racetrack opens.
- 1930 - Baja California Territory split, Tijuana becomes part of Territorio Norte de Baja California.
- 1940 - Population: 16,486.
- 1943 - Red Cross established.
- 1944 - Cine Zaragoza (movie theatre) opens.
- 1946 - Jai alai arena opens.
- 1950 - Population: 59,962.
- 1951 - Cine Bujazan (movie theatre) opens.
- 1953 - City becomes part of Tijuana Municipality in the state of Baja California.
- 1954 - Gustavo Aubanel Vallejo becomes mayor.
- 1957 - Autonomous University of Baja California, Tijuana established in Mesa de Otay.
- 1958 - Tijuana Airport opens.
- 1959
  - Dorian's in business.
  - Solo Angels Motorcycle Club formed.

=== 1960s-1990s ===
- 1960 - XEWT-TDT television begins broadcasting.
- 1961 - XETRA radio begins all-news format.
- 1964
  - Catedral de Nuestra Señora de Guadalupe established.
  - Tijuana Christian mission founded.
- 1965 - National Border Industrialization Program begins.
- 1970 - Centro de Enseñanza Técnica y Superior campus established.
- 1971 - Escuela Preparatoria Federal Lázaro Cárdenas (school) and Highland Prince Academy de Mexico active.
- 1973
  - Cartolandia shantytown razed.
  - Colonia Tierra y Libertad developed.
- 1976 - Estadio Nacional de Tijuana (stadium) opens.
- 1977 - La Casa de la Cultura Tijuana (cultural institution) established.
- 1980
  - Zeta newspaper begins publication.
  - Population: 461,267.
- 1982
  - Tijuana Cultural Center opens.
  - Plaza Río Tijuana (shopping centre) and Las Torres built.
  - Northwest Aeronautical Institute established.
- 1984 - Associacion de Mixtecos Residentes en Tijuana established.
- 1986 - El Colegio de la Frontera Norte established.
- 1990
  - Orquesta de Baja California headquartered in city.
  - Population: 698,752.
- 1992
  - Tijuana No! (musical group) active.
  - inSITE art exhibition begins.
- 1993 - Sister city relationship established with San Diego, USA.
- 1994
  - Cinépolis multiplex movie theatre in business.
  - March 23: Politician Luis Donaldo Colosio assassinated.
- 1995 - Population: 966,097.
- 1998 - Instituto Municipal de Arte y Cultura established.
- 1999 - Nortec Collective (musical group) active.
- 2000 - Population: 1,148,681.

== 21st century ==
- 2003
  - Consejo Fronterizo de Arte y Cultura (arts organization) incorporated.
  - Eudist Servants of the 11th Hour active (approximate date).
- 2005
  - Hospital Angeles Tijuana opens.
  - Tijuana Cimarrones baseball team formed.
- 2007
  - Club Tijuana Xoloscuintles football team formed.
  - Centro Médico Excel built.
- 2008
  - Police retrained.
  - Park Towers built.
  - Casa del Tunel art gallery and District 10 Gallery open.
- 2009 - Green View Tower and VIA Corporativo built.
- 2010
  - April 4: 2010 Baja California earthquake.
  - Masyid Al Islam (mosque) and La Caja Galería open.
  - Carlos Bustamante Anchondo becomes mayor.
  - Population: 1,300,983; municipality 1,559,683.
- 2012 - Museum of Mariachi and Tequila opens.
- 2015 - October: San Diego-Tijuana drug tunnel discovered.
- 2016
  - The Sistema Integral de Transporte de Tijuana opens for bus rapid transit service.
  - Haitian migrant caravan arrives in Tijuana in October, forming the Pequeña Haití community.
- 2018 - Honduran migrant caravan arrives in Tijuana in November, many of whom are part of the LGBT community, settling mostly around the Playas de Tijuana area.
- 2020 - Population: 1,810 645; municipality 1, 922,523.
- 2022 - August: Tijuana is locked down after dozens of vehicles are burned around the city and a curfew is imposed purportedly by Jalisco New Generation Cartel.
- 2023 - Mayor Montserrat Caballero is relocated to a Mexican army base after receiving death threats.

=== Anticipated future event(s) ===
- 2024 - Tijuana and San Diego set to host World Design Capital 2024.

== See also ==
- List of mayors of Tijuana
- History of Tijuana (in Spanish)
- Baja California history (state)

== Bibliography ==
Published in 20th century

- John A. Price (1973), Tijuana: urbanization in a border culture, Indiana, USA: University of Notre Dame Press, ISBN 0268004773
- Robert W. Duemling (1981), San Diego and Tijuana: conflict and cooperation between two border communities; a case study, Executive Seminar in National and International Affairs, Rosslyn, Va.: U.S. Department of State, Foreign Service Institute
- T.D. Proffitt. 1994. Tijuana: The History of a Mexican Metropolis. San Diego: San Diego State University Press.
- John Fisher (1999), "Baja California and the Pacific Northwest: Tijuana", Mexico, Rough Guides (4th ed.), London, p. 66+, OL 24935876M
- Harry Crosby (2000), Paul Ganster (ed.), Tijuana 1964: a photographic and historic view, San Diego, CA: San Diego State University Press, Institute for Regional Studies of the Californias, ISBN 0925613312

Published in 21st century

- Glen Sparrow (2001). "San Diego-Tijuana: Not quite a binational city or region". GeoJournal. 54 (1): 73–83. doi:10.1023/A:1021144816403. JSTOR 41147639. S2CID 153015715.
- Lawrence D. Taylor (2001). "The Mining Boom in Baja California from 1850 to 1890 and the Emergence of Tijuana as a Border Community". Journal of the Southwest. 43 (4): 463–492. JSTOR 40170167.
- Brisa Violeta Carrasco Gallegos (2009). "Tijuana: Border, Migration, and Gated Communities". Journal of the Southwest. 51 (4): 457–475. doi:10.1353/jsw.2009.0007. JSTOR 40599703. S2CID 110186426.
- Josh Kun and Fiamma Montezemolo, ed. (2012), Tijuana Dreaming: Life and Art at the Global Border, Durham, NC: Duke University Press, ISBN 9780822352907
- Sam Lubell (September 21, 2012). "Tijuana Rebuilds on Its Art". New York Times.
