= Zona Río =

- Neighborhood of Tijuana
- Zona Urbana Río Tijuana; Tijuana River Urban Zone
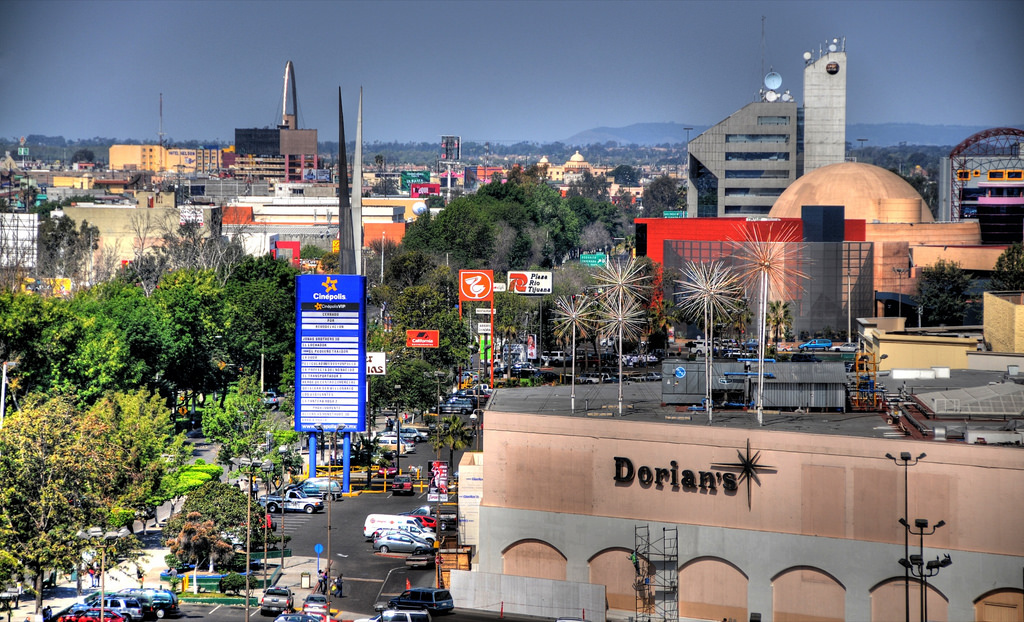
- View of Río Zone

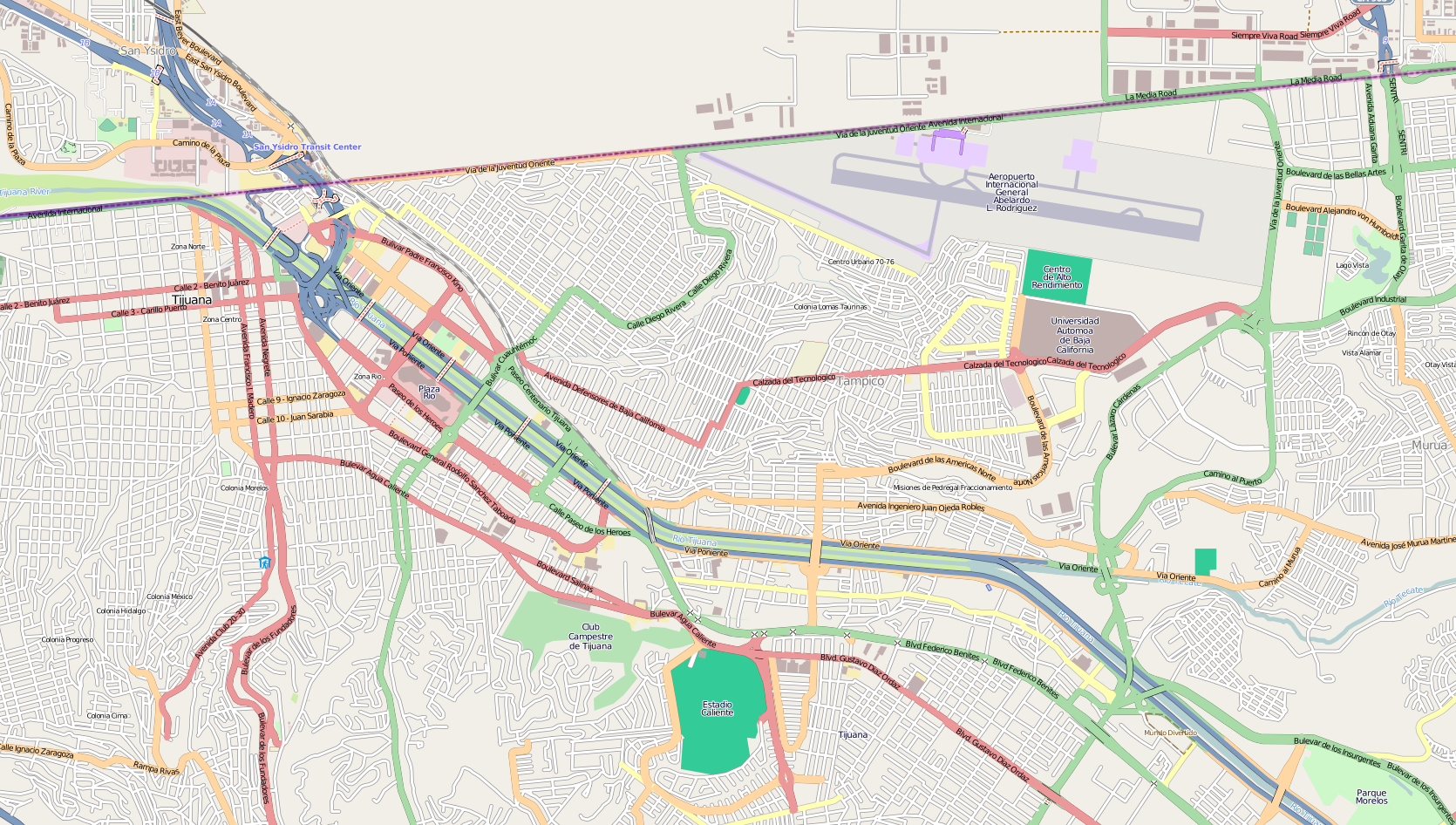
- Location within Central Tijuana
- Coordinates: 32.530939°N 117.017616°W
- Country: Mexico
- State: Baja California
- Municipality (municipio): Tijuana
- Borough (delegación): Centro

Zona Río (English: "River Zone") is an official zone, and the main modern business district, of the city of Tijuana, Mexico.

Zona Río is located at a strategic point, in the north of the city, about 1 mile (1.6 km) from the U.S.-Mexico border and 9 miles (14 km) from downtown San Diego. The Río Zone is within the Delegación Centro, or Central borough, of Tijuana. The old downtown of Tijuana, Zona Centro, borders Zona Río on the west.

The Zona Río is home to most of the regional headquarters for commercial and financial businesses and health services. The city's largest mall, Plaza Río Tijuana, the central market, and the majority of Tijuana's larger hotels and upscale restaurants are also located here, along Zona Río's three main avenues, Paseo de los Héroes, Avenida Padre Kino and Boulevard General Rodolfo Sánchez Taboada. The Zona Río office space submarket had, in 2016, 111,059 square metres (1,195,430 sq ft) of class A and B office space, with another 25,043 square metres (269,560 sq ft) in the contiguous Agua Caliente submarket, for a total of 136,102 square metres (1,464,990 sq ft). As such, the area can be considered an edge city.

Although being comparatively small in comparison with other Mexican cities main business districts, such as those of Monterrey and Guadalajara, Zona Río has notable skyscrapers, which due to the relative distance between them, are very prominent. The tallest buildings are the 28-story twin towers that are home for the Plaza Aguacaliente and Grand Hotel Tijuana, commonly known by locals as Las Torres or The Towers.

== Name ==
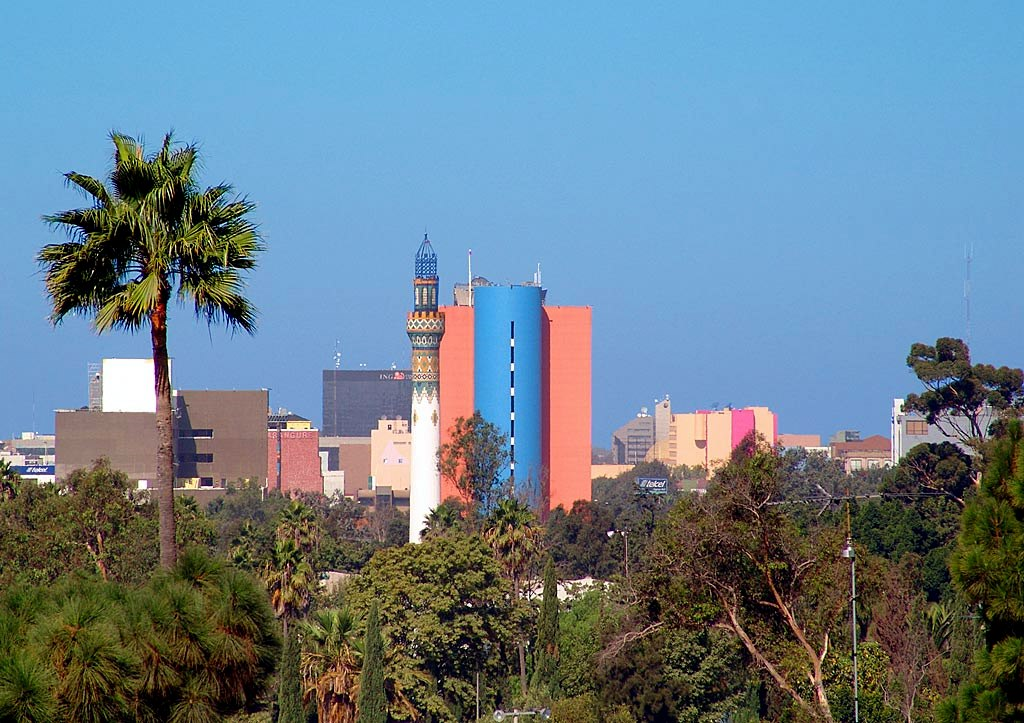
Rio Zone in 2005

Zona Río literally translates into English as River Zone. This name is owed to the nearly dried Tijuana River, which divides Zona Río. The river is crossed by many bridges to allow traffic between the west side of Zona Río, located at the west-center of the city, and the east of Zona Rio, located in the east-center of Tijuana.

== Principal thoroughfares ==
=== Paseo de los Héroes ===
One of the most important avenues in the whole city of Tijuana is the Paseo de los Héroes (lit. "Promenade of Heroes"). Along this avenue are located most of the financial, commercial, and touristic businesses of Zona Río and the entire city. Insurance companies, numerous banks, such as BBVA-Bancomer and Banamex, and shopping squares, such as Plaza Río Tijuana, the largest mall in the city, have their headquarters in this avenue. The cultural heart-point of the city, the Tijuana Cultural Center, is on Paseo de los Héroes. Two recently built skyscrapers are exclusively occupied by two different hospitals and its corporations. Most of the high-end hotels of the entire city are located in Paseo de los Héroes avenue.

Paseo de los Héroes is also noted for its many monuments and sculptures, like the Monumento a la Raza (Spanish for Monument to the Race), the Abraham Lincoln statue, the Ignacio Zaragoza statue, the Cuauhtémoc statue, the Lázaro Cárdenas statue, and others, to which the avenue largely owes its name, Road of the Heroes.

==== Tijuana CowParade 2008 ====
During June 2008, Tijuana was hosting the CowParade. Along with the also popular Avenida Revolución, Paseo de los Héroes holds many of the painted cows, in such popular places like the Monumento a la Raza and the Tijuana Cultural Center.

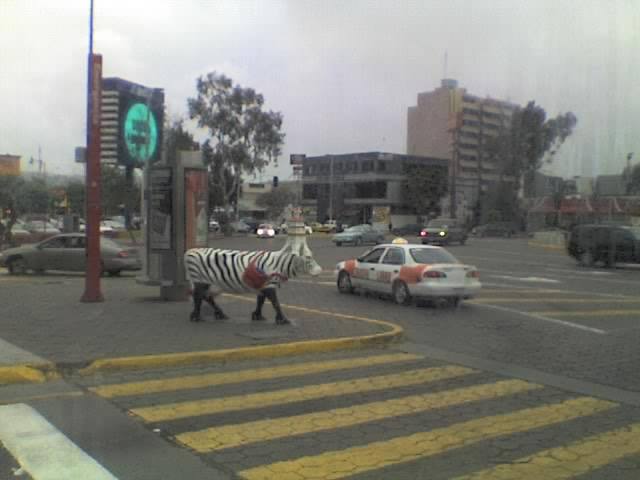
The Miss Tijuana cow around the Monumento a la Raza

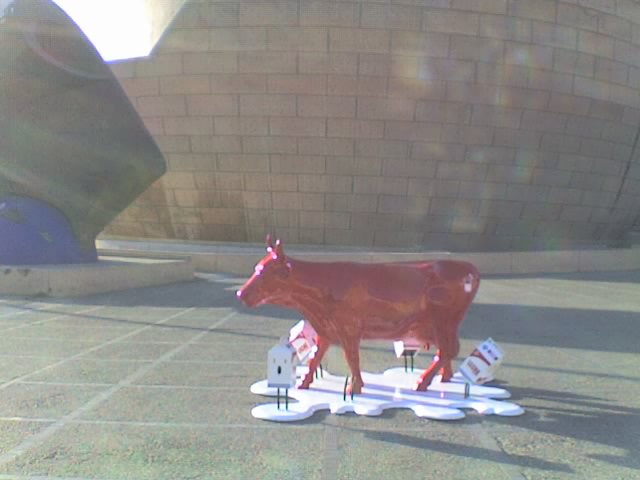

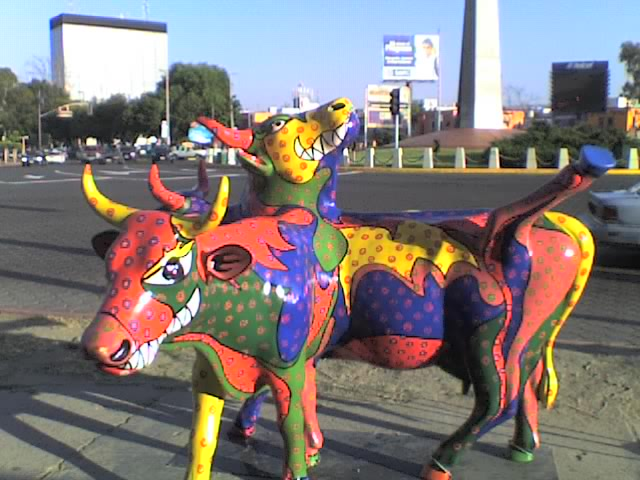
View of Cacho cow, in front of the Monumento a la Raza

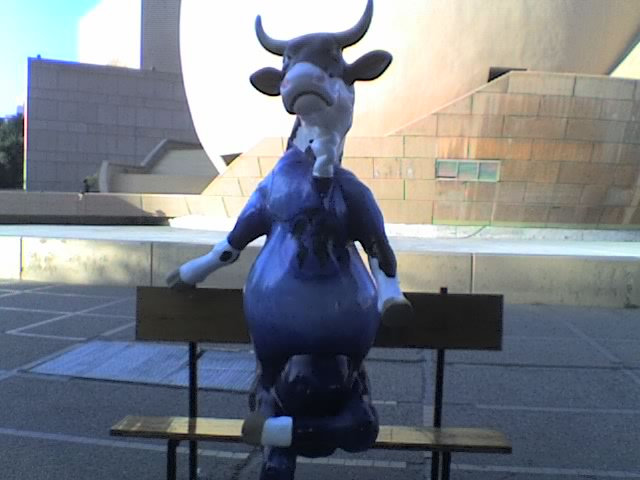
View of El chico de la banca cow, at Tijuana Cultural Center

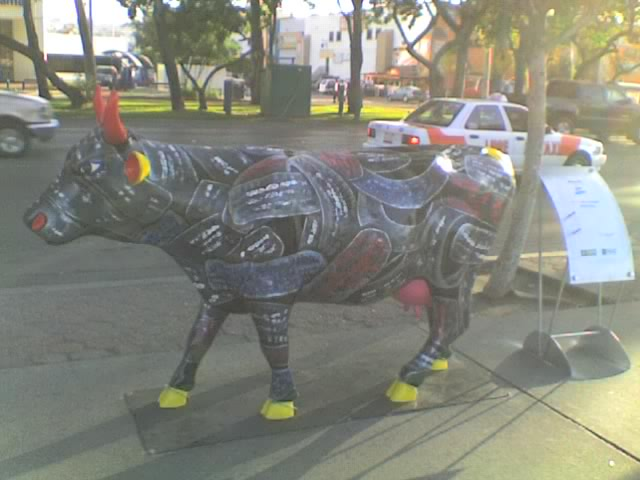
Mina y contamina cow

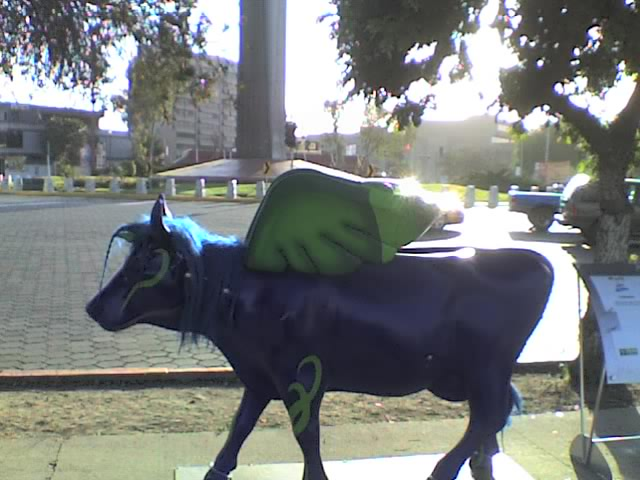
View of Sueñame cow, in front of the Monumento a la Raza

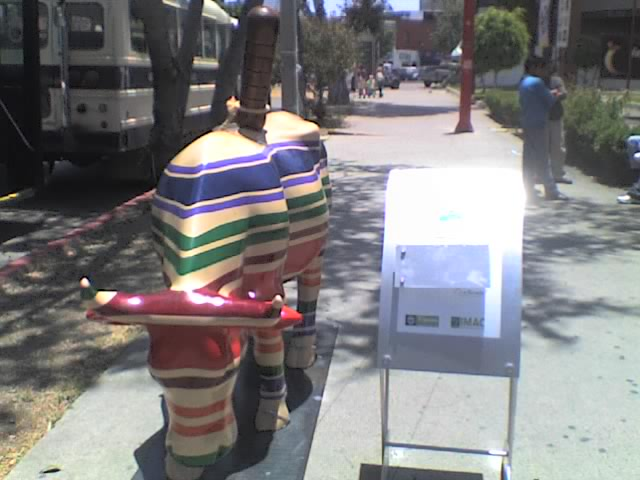
View of Vacalero cow

=== Boulevard Sánchez Taboada ===
In contrast to Paseo de los Héroes or Aguas Calientes, this is not one of the main avenues of the whole city, but rather only of Zona Río.

This avenue is the main gastronomical corridor of Zona Río, offering the widest variety of gastronomy in the entire city. There are restaurants offering food from Thailand, Mongolia, Greece, Brazil or Israel, not to mention the typical Italian, Spanish, French, Argentinian, Chinese and American foods, plus the widespread Japanese sushi. As regards of Mexican food, the common tacos, Baja California-seafood, and the antojitos (Spanish term for traditional Mexican snacks or tapas), they are found almost everywhere in the avenue.

=== Boulevard Agua Caliente ===
This is one of the most important and largest avenues in the city, together with Paseo de los Héroes, with both crossing nearly the entire city. Prior to the opening of Tijuana's new airport at Otay district in 1958, the city's former airport was located along present-day Blvd. Agua Caliente.

Also one of the main gastronomical corridors in the city, and a touristic and commercial avenue, Blvd. Agua Caliente may be a combination of both Paseo de los Héroes and Blvd. Sanchez Taboada, but with a characteristic of being the place where sports auditoriums and stadiums are located.

The Agua Caliente Hippodrome and Racetrack is located here. The Municipal Auditorium of Tijuana, home of both of Tijuana's basketball teams, and the Estadio Casas GeoCaliente Stadium, home of the city's newly formed soccer team.

The tallest buildings of Tijuana, Las Torres (officially Plaza Agua Caliente & Grand Hotel Tijuana), are located here, along some other buildings and public hospitals.

=== Paseo del Centenario ===
Paseo del Centenario ("Centennial Avenue") is also another important avenue within the area. The Municipal Palace of Tijuana is located here, along with the State Government Center of Tijuana.

New City Residential is located here, as well as the Tijuana General Hospital and many other notable buildings.

== Notable landmarks and places of interest ==
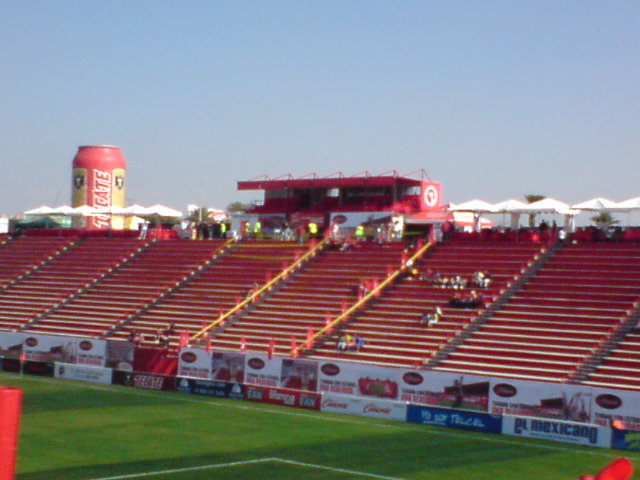
Estadio Caliente

- Municipal Palace of Tijuana
- Tijuana Cultural Center
- Agua Caliente Casino and Hotel National Heritage Site
- Estadio Caliente and Caliente Hippodrome
- Plaza Rio Shopping Mall

== Buildings and skyscrapers ==
- Las Torres (Plaza Agua Caliente & Grand Hotel Tijuana)
- Green View Tower
- ING Comercial America Building
- Centro Médico Excel
- Hospital Angeles Tijuana
- Torre Platino
- Centura Tower
- Camino Real Hotel
- New City Residential
- Edificio GILT
- Centro de Control y Mando de Tijuana
- Edificio Ventura
- Torre Bellavista
- Torre MOL
- VIA Corporativo
- Hospital General de Tijuana
- Torre Zentrum
- FRISA Building
- Wadiah Building
- Rodeo Building

== Gallery ==
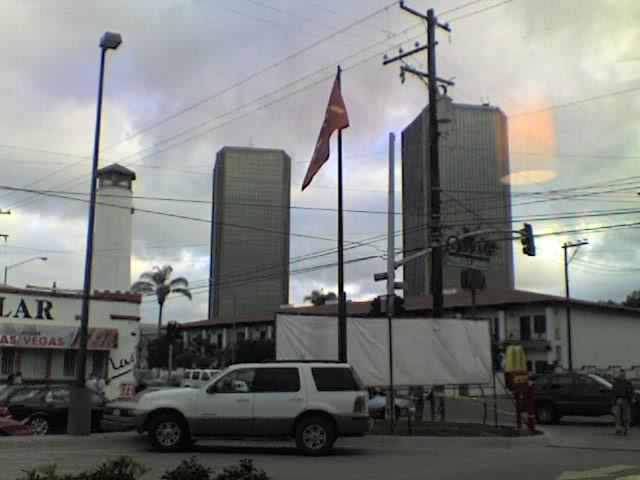
Grand Hotel Tijuana at night

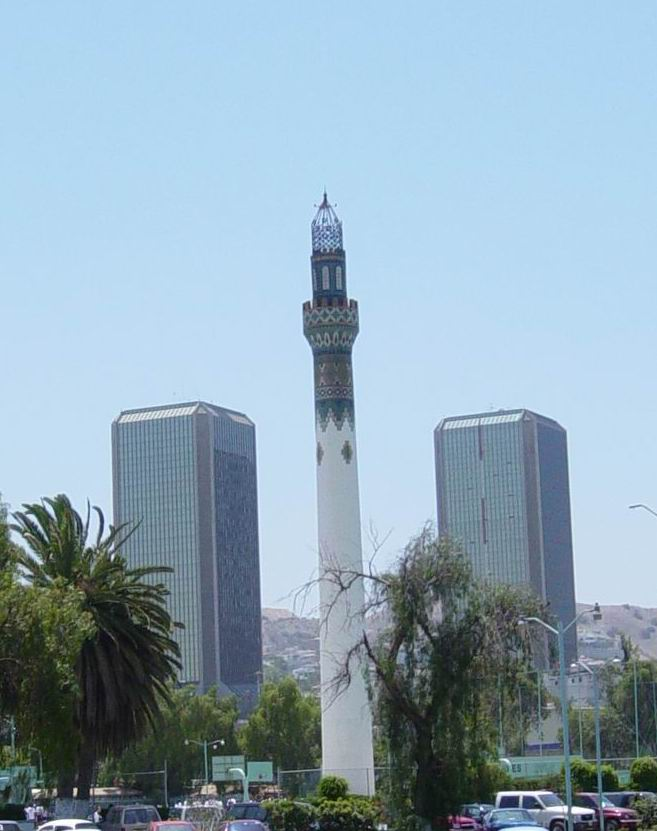
Agua Caliente Minaret and Grand Hotel Tijuana

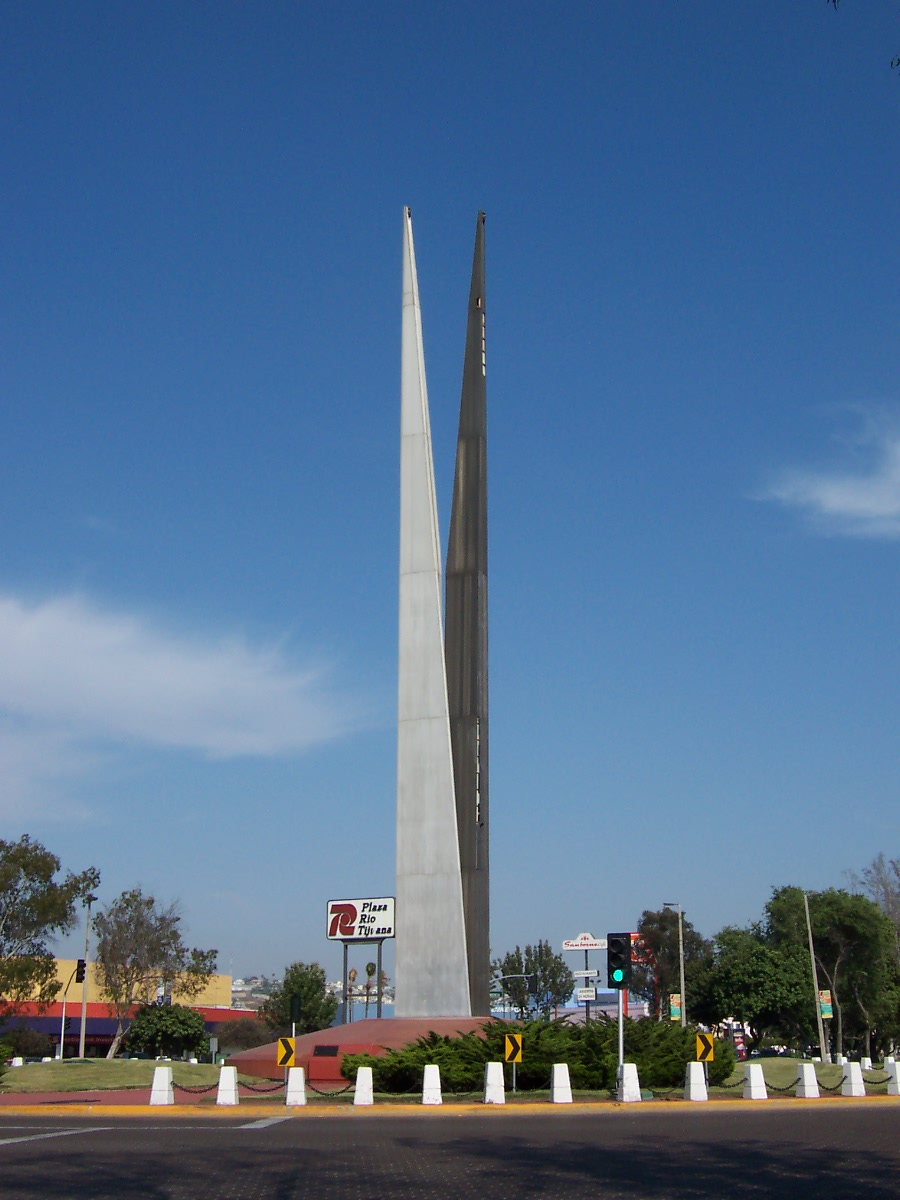
View of the Monumento a la Raza, at Paseo de los Héroes

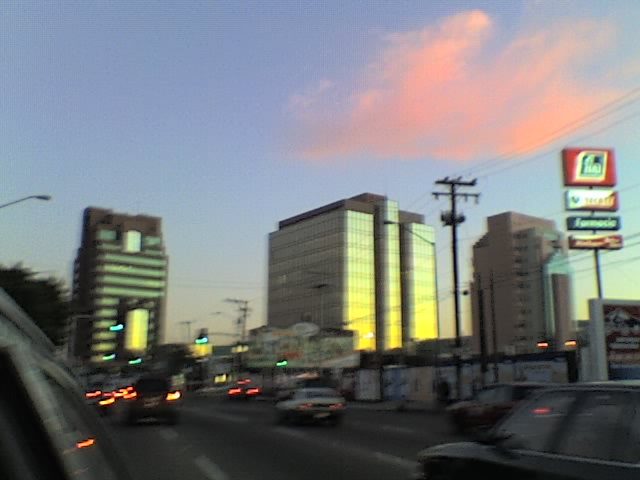
Skyscrapers along Blvd. Agua Caliente

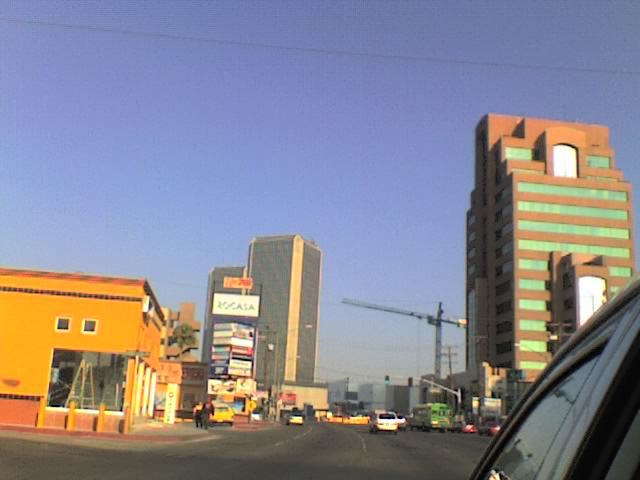
Grand Hotel Tijuana and Centura Tower along Blvd. Agua Caliente

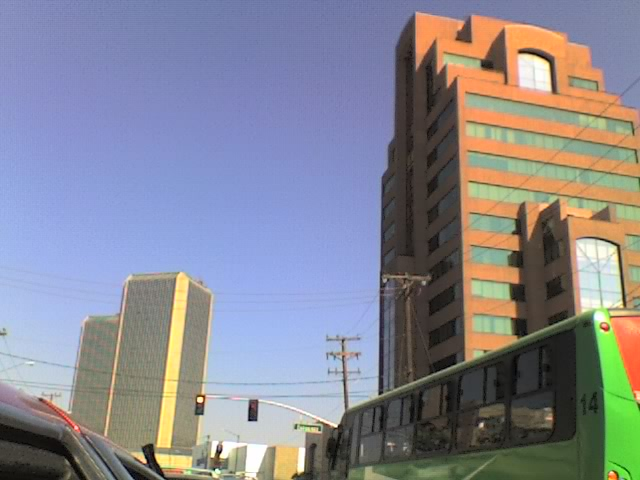
Grand Hotel Tijuana and Centura Tower along Blvd. Agua Caliente

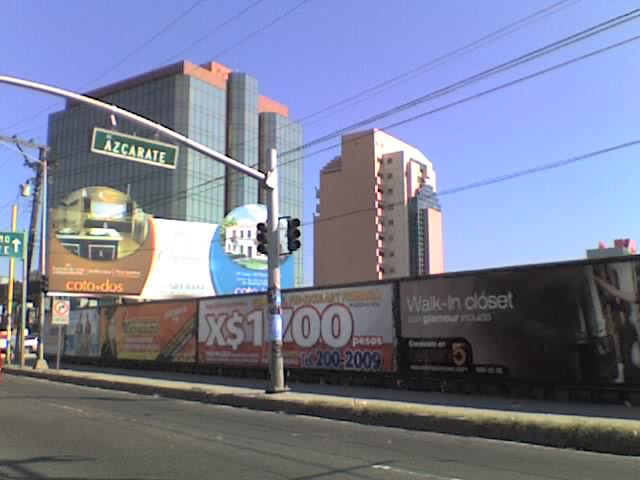
Skyscrapers along Blvd. Agua Caliente

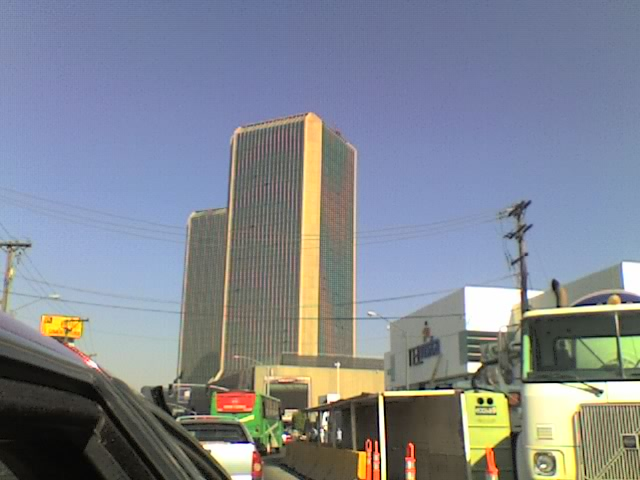
View of Grand Hotel Tijuana

== See also ==
- Downtown San Diego
