= Sergio Peraza =

Mexican sculptor (born 1966)

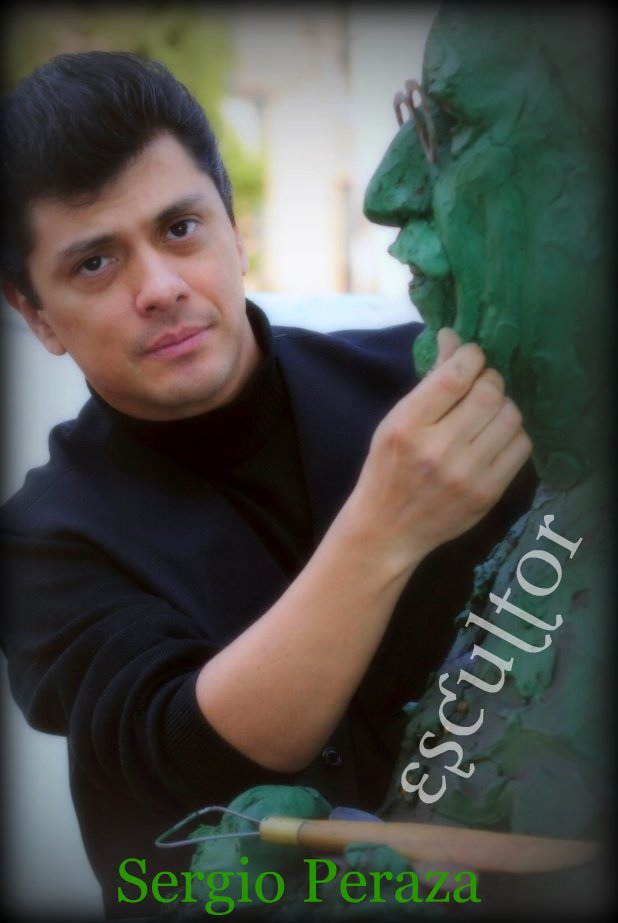
- Born: Sergio Andrés Peraza Ávila; 1966 (age 59–60); Mexico City, Mexico
- Education: Escuela Nacional de Artes Plásticas (UNAM)
- Known for: Sculpture, portrait busts, Xoloarte
- Notable work: Cantinflas Torero (with Humberto Peraza); Virgen del Carmen Stella Maris, Ciudad del Carmen (2014)
- Relatives: Humberto Peraza (father)
- Website: www.sergioperaza.com

Sergio Andrés Peraza Ávila (born 1966) is a Mexican sculptor and the son of the sculptor Humberto Peraza, in whose Mexico City studio he trained. He is best known as a portrait sculptor: for more than a decade his busts of writers honored at the Palacio de Minería International Book Fair stood on the fair's main staircase, and his portraits of authors, scholars and composers have been shown in libraries, universities and public squares across Mexico.

Peraza has also made the xoloitzcuintle, the hairless dog of pre-Hispanic Mexico, a recurring subject, first in a 2000 exhibition at the Templo Mayor Museum and later under the name Xoloarte. His public works include Cantinflas Torero at the Plaza México, made with his father; the Virgen del Carmen Stella Maris, a bronze statue standing in the sea off Ciudad del Carmen, Campeche; bronze busts sunk as artificial reefs off Cozumel; and statues of matadors at the bullring in Aguascalientes. He has exhibited in France, Scotland, the United States and Russia.

== Early life and education ==
Peraza was born in Mexico City in 1966, the youngest of four children of Humberto Peraza and Angelina Ávila. He learned to sculpt as a child in his father's house and studio in Mexico City, while his mother encouraged his interest in music and reading. He studied visual arts at the Escuela Nacional de Artes Plásticas of the National Autonomous University of Mexico, where the painter Luis Nishizawa taught him woodcut, and later took a course in ceramic-shell bronze casting in the United States. The painter Raúl Anguiano mentored him. For a time he signed his work only "Sergio Andrés", to avoid confusion with his father, until a teacher persuaded him to use the family name.

== Career ==
=== Early work and France ===
Peraza's first solo exhibition, Los Perazos de Peraza, opened in 1994 at the Centro Cultural y Social Veracruzano in Mexico City, sponsored by Anguiano. The same year he and his father made Cantinflas Torero, a statue of the comedian Cantinflas as a bullfighter that stands inside the Plaza México.

In 1996 he made a bust of the historian Miguel León-Portilla, whose letters of recommendation helped him obtain a grant to work in France. He lived in Paris in 1996 and 1997, working at an art foundry and showing a touring exhibition at the Mexican embassy, the Mexican cultural center in Paris and the Château de Martainville. Before returning to Mexico he received the UNESCO Picasso–Miró medal. Back in Mexico he exhibited Formas Infieles at the National Polytechnic Institute's Centro Cultural Jaime Torres Bodet in 1998 and Singularidades de Sergio Peraza at the Secretariat of Communications and Transport, and in 2000 he had a solo show at a gallery in Metz.

=== Xoloarte ===
In October 2000 Peraza opened De ánimas y perros at the Templo Mayor Museum in Mexico City. The exhibition presented five years of work on the xoloitzcuintle: bronze, terracotta and paper figurines, drawings and prints, some based on figures from pre-Hispanic tombs and temples. He later named this line of work Xoloarte. In September 2024 he was the only sculptor among nine artists invited to Terre du Mexique, a month-long exhibition at the town hall of Paris's 6th arrondissement, where he showed only xoloitzcuintle pieces in bronze and resin.

=== Portrait busts ===
Bust of the archaeologist Manuel Gamio (2014)

Portraiture makes up much of Peraza's output. His bust of Italo Calvino, his favorite writer, was shown at the Palacio de Minería International Book Fair in Mexico City, and from about 2005 he made busts of the authors the fair honored each year, without a fee, for display on the central staircase of Manuel Tolsá's building. They included Federico García Lorca and, in 2007, Gabriela Mistral on the 50th anniversary of her death. His busts appeared at the fair for twelve consecutive years, and in 2016 its director, Fernando Macotela, paid tribute to him, the first time the fair had honored a visual artist rather than a writer. His busts of writers and scholars, among them Carlos Fuentes, Mario Vargas Llosa and Efraín Huerta, later toured libraries and universities in Mexico as Los Rostros de las Letras. He also made busts of composers, among them Consuelo Velázquez and José Alfredo Jiménez, for a square honoring Mexican songwriters on Avenida Patriotismo in the Condesa district of Mexico City; in 2024 several of the busts were reported missing.

Over more than a decade Peraza made three busts of Octavio Paz, showing him as a young diplomat in India and in old age. By 2018 none had left his studio: offers to place them at the Chamber of Deputies, El Colegio Nacional, the Palacio de Minería and the Mexico City government had fallen through, which he attributed in part to disputes between Paz's foundation and his heirs.

He has also portrayed scholars. In December 2014 the director of INAH, María Teresa Franco, unveiled his bronze bust of the archaeologist Manuel Gamio during the centenary of the Templo Mayor excavations.

=== Monuments ===
Virgen del Carmen Stella Maris in the sea off Ciudad del Carmen (2014)

Peraza's largest work is the Virgen del Carmen Stella Maris, a bronze statue 12–14 metres (39–46 ft) tall, depending on the source, that stands in the sea some 26 metres (85 ft) off the malecón of Ciudad del Carmen. It was unveiled in July 2014, during the city's festivities for Our Lady of Mount Carmel, and Peraza has called it the work he most enjoyed making. In 2026 it underwent a full restoration after damage from salt air and corrosion.

For the Cozumel Scuba Fest, Peraza has made bronze busts to be sunk on the seabed off Cozumel: one of the Mexican diver Ramón Bravo, submerged in December 2014, and one of the American oceanographer Sylvia Earle, about 1 metre (3 ft) high, scheduled for December 2015. He leaves the pieces untreated so that marine life can colonize them as artificial reefs.

For the 50th anniversary of the Plaza de Toros Monumental in Aguascalientes, Peraza made a statue of the matador Joselito Adame, unveiled in November 2024 in the new Plaza de los Toreros. It shows Adame twice, as a boy dreaming of the ring and as an adult matador, and stands near his father's 1974 statue of Fermín Espinosa "Armillita". A statue of the matador Arturo Macías followed in April 2025.

=== Work abroad ===
In 2009 Peraza showed a sculpture at the Salon of the Société Nationale des Beaux-Arts in the Carrousel du Louvre in Paris. In 2010 he lectured at Fudan University in Shanghai and gave two sculptures to the Mexican consulates in Shanghai and Hong Kong. In 2011 he was artist in residence at Glasgow Sculpture Studios, and the Ekaterinburg Art Foundation invited him to represent Mexico in an international sculpture exhibition shown in Moscow.

== Personal life ==
Peraza is married to the chef Vanessa Domínguez. He still has his father's former house and studio in Mexico City but has moved to San Miguel de Allende, Guanajuato, where he is building a new studio.

== Selected works ==
Year	Work	Location
1994	Cantinflas Torero (with Humberto Peraza)	Plaza México, Mexico City
2007	Bust of Gabriela Mistral	Palacio de Minería, Mexico City
2014	Virgen del Carmen Stella Maris	Ciudad del Carmen, Campeche
2014	Bust of Ramón Bravo (underwater)	Cozumel, Quintana Roo
2014	Bust of Manuel Gamio	Templo Mayor, Mexico City
2015	Bust of Sylvia Earle (underwater)	Cozumel, Quintana Roo
2024	Joselito Adame	Plaza de Toros Monumental, Aguascalientes

== Gallery ==
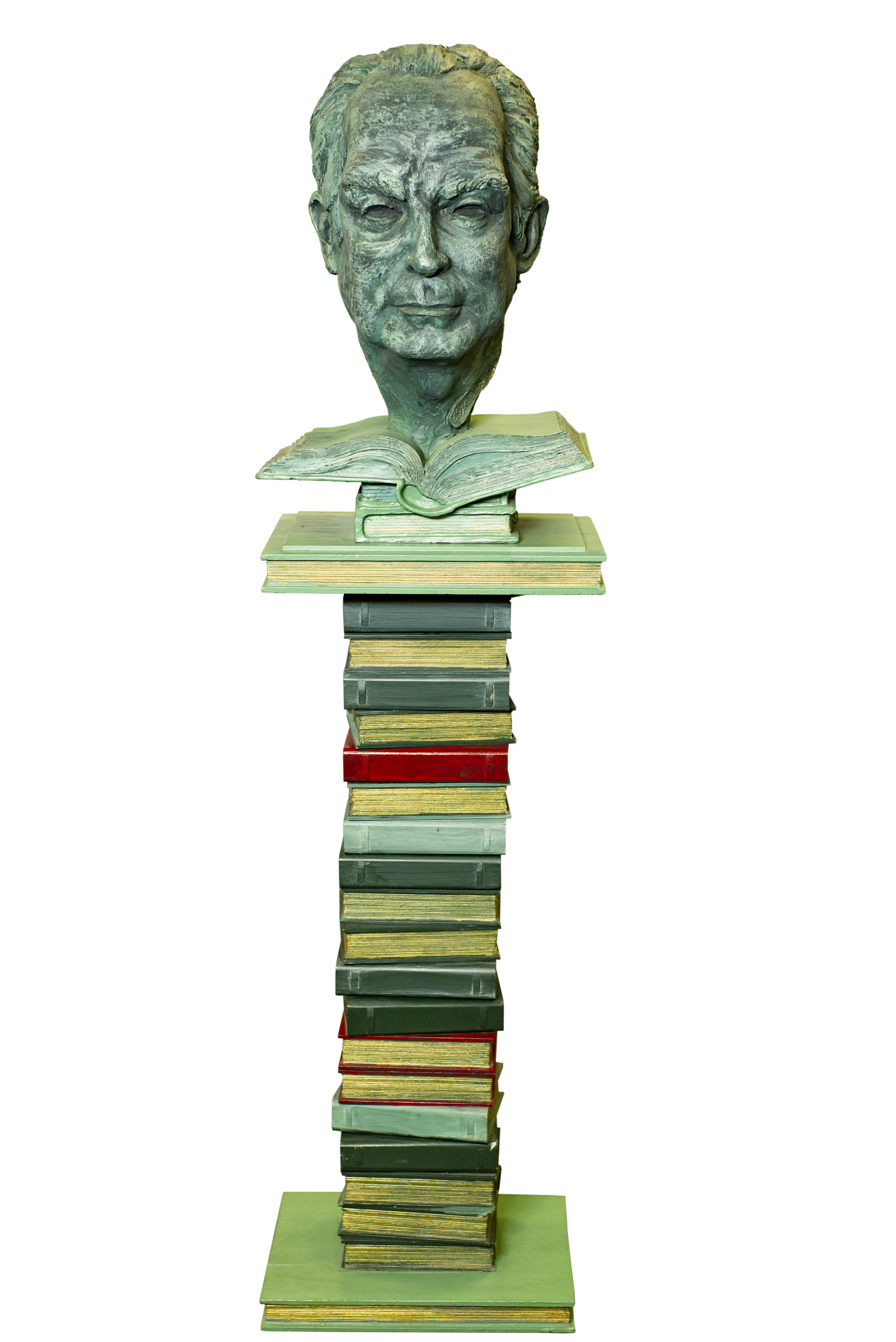
Italo Calvino

Federico García Lorca

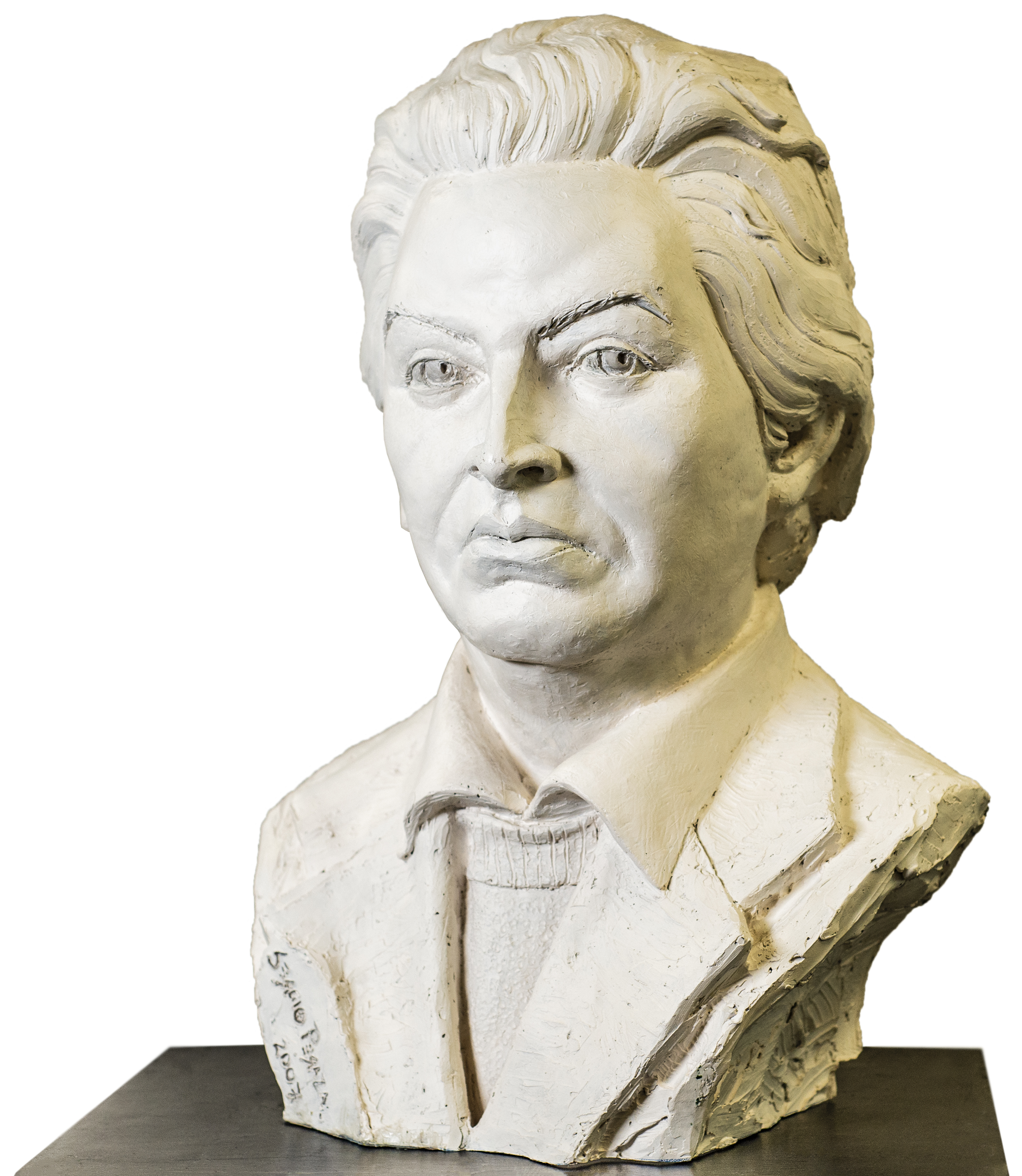
Gabriela Mistral (2007)

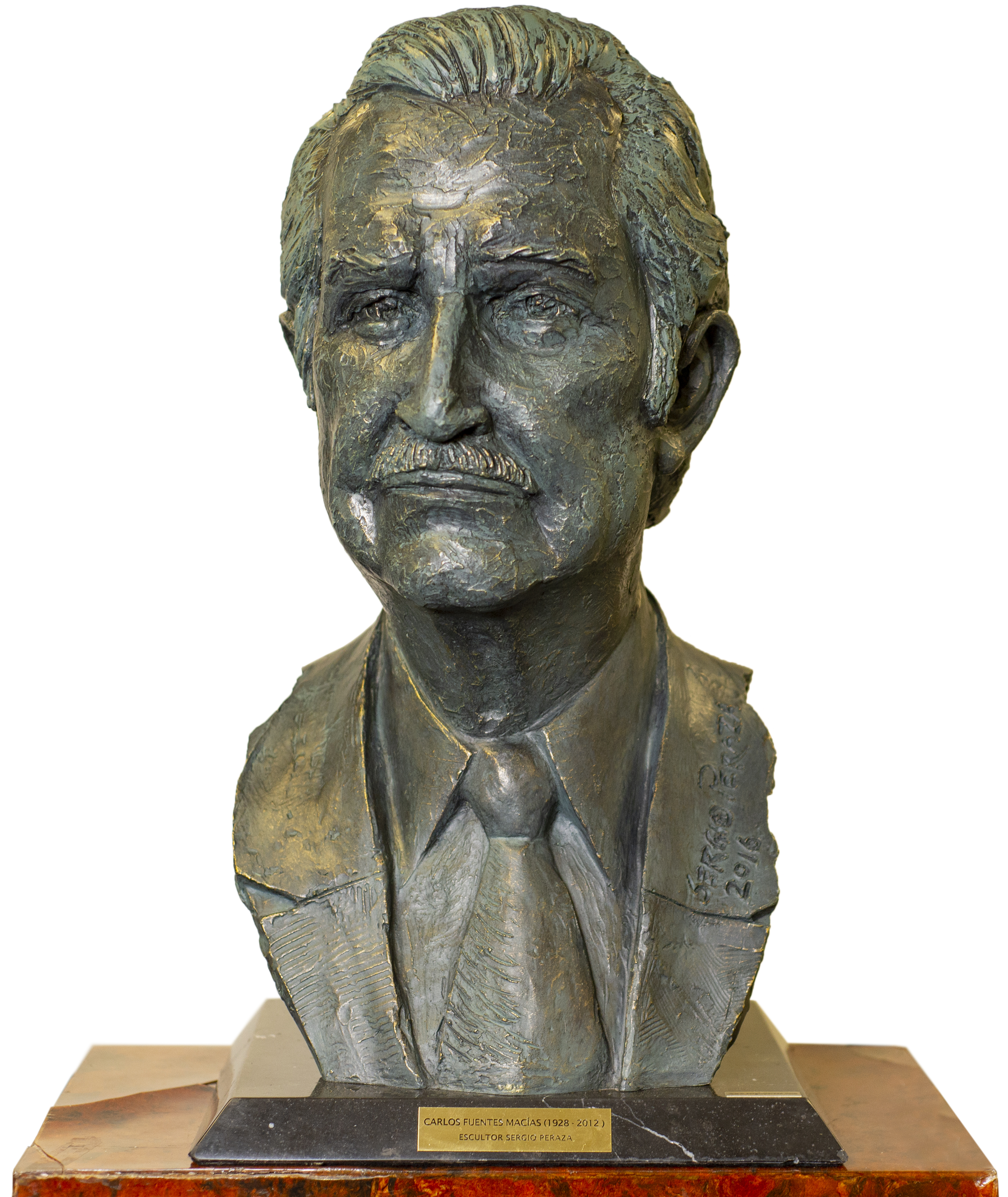
Carlos Fuentes

Octavio Paz

Ramón López Velarde

José Antonio Zorrilla, Plaza de los Compositores, Mexico City
