= New City Residential =

Fede Residential
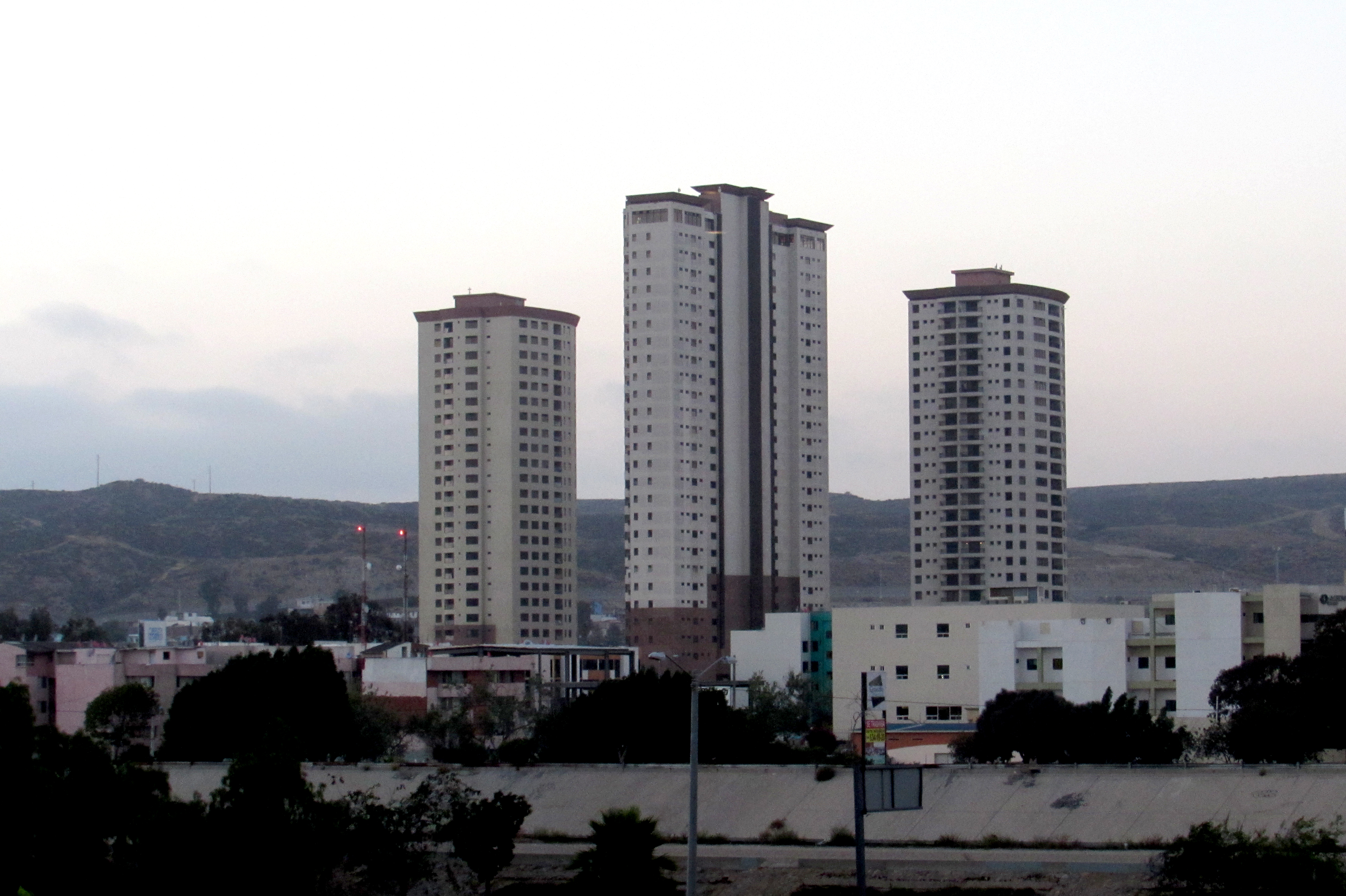
- New City in 2015

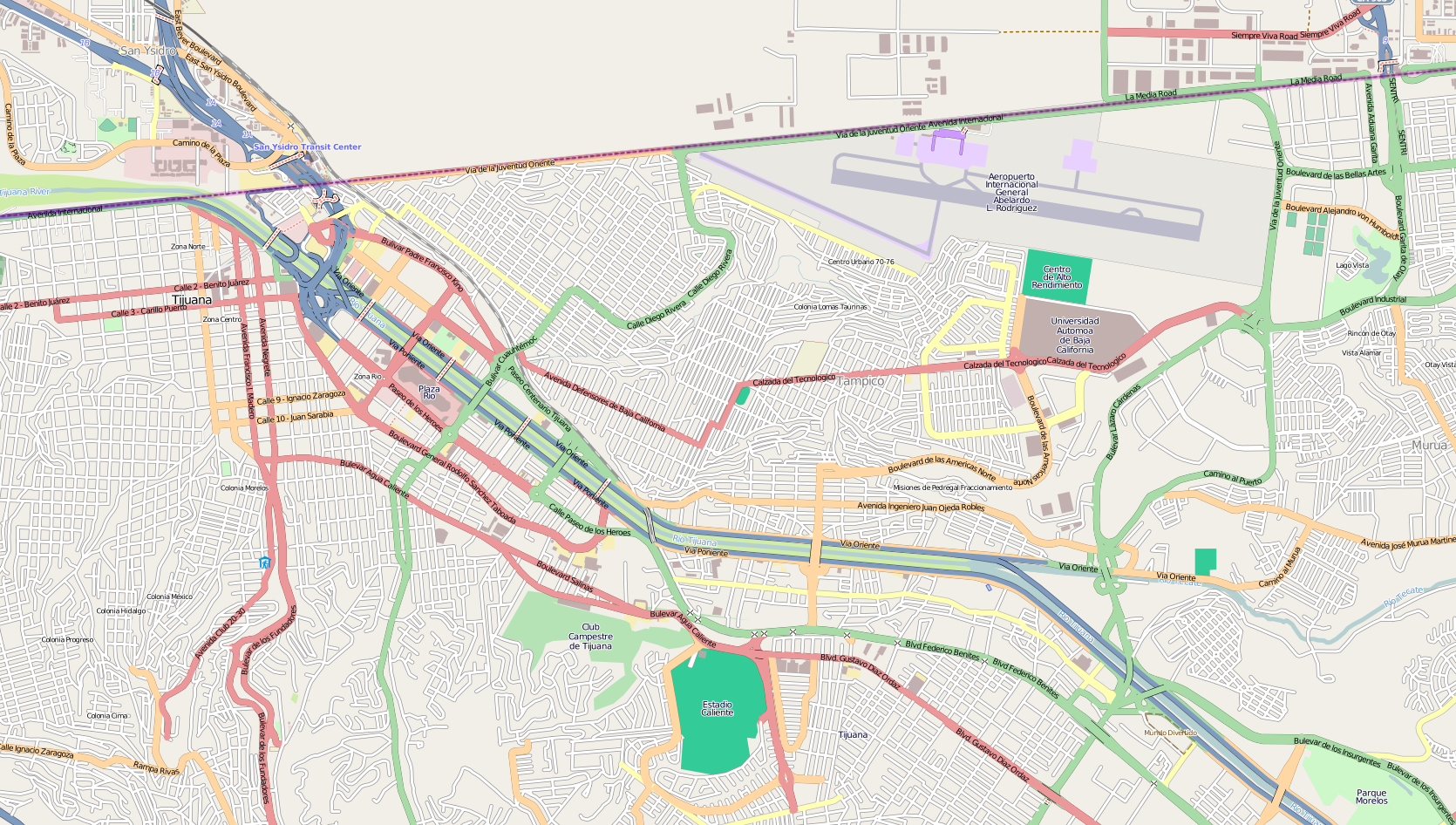
- location in central Tijuana

General information
- Type: Residential
- Location: Zona Río, Tijuana
- Coordinates: 32.537246°N 117.022642°W
- Construction started: 2006
- Completed: 2007 (Diamond Tower and Emerald Tower I)

Height
- Roof: 101.8 metres (334 ft) (Diamante Tower only), 88.7 metres (291 ft) (all towers)

Technical details
- Floor count: 27 (Diamante Tower only), 24 (all towers)

Design and construction
- Developer: TrueStone Properties

NewCity Residential is a residential high-rise complex of seven skyscrapers in Tijuana, Baja California, Mexico. In the San Diego–Tijuana, region the buildings are increasingly being referred to as New City. The complex was built between 2006 and 2007 and consists of seven towers, out of which four have been built. With 27 stories, Diamond Tower is currently the tallest building in Tijuana. The other six towers will be the second-tallest buildings in Tijuana, with 24 stories.

The complex is located within Tijuana's central business district, Zona Río.

== Architecture ==
The project was designed by the local Espazio architectural Group led by Arq. Jorge Gutierrez in association with Estrategias Urbanas consulting represented by Arq. Hector Osuna Jaime. New City was designed with the idea of creating a setting of comfort for the surrounding San Diego-Tijuana populace. It was also designed to appeal to most people and features a modern and unique look.

=== Design ===
The buildings are surrounded by a tall concrete wall and maintain gated access. The towers facade material consists of concrete and the buildings have a curtain wall facade style. The style of building is postmodern and thus contemporary.

== Gallery ==
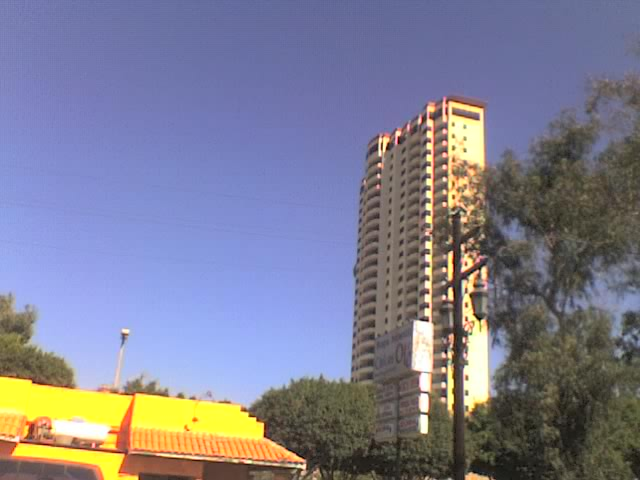
NewCity's Diamond Tower as of October 2008.

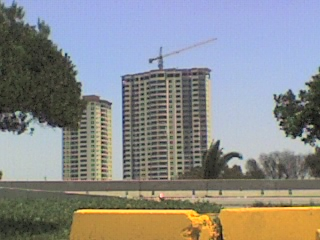
NewCity towers in early 2008.

== See also ==
- List of tallest buildings in Tijuana

Preceded by Las Torres	Tallest structure in Tijuana; 2008-present	Succeeded by incumbent
