= Paseo de los Héroes =

Avenue in Tijuana, Baja California, Mexico

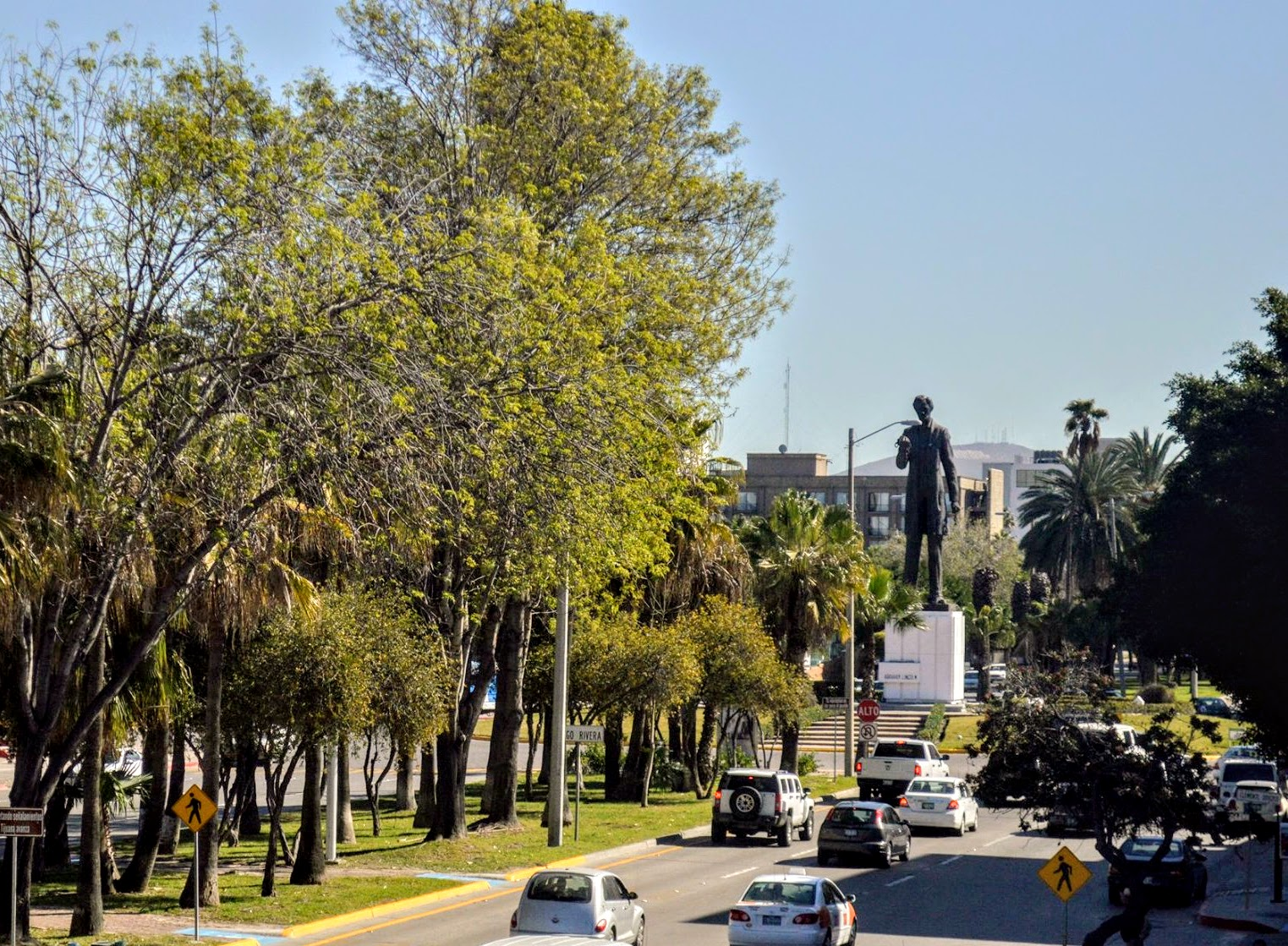
- Paseo de los Héroes, with the Abraham Lincoln monument in the distance
- Former name: Avenida Adolfo López Mateos
- Length: 5.5 km (3.4 mi)
- Location: Tijuana, Baja California, Mexico
- Northwest end: Calle Segunda and Calle Tercera, near the San Ysidro Port of Entry
- Southeast end: Bulevar Federico Benítez

Other
- Known for: Tijuana Cultural Center, Plaza Río Tijuana, monuments in its roundabouts

Paseo de los Héroes ("Promenade of the Heroes") is an avenue in Tijuana, Baja California, Mexico. It is the main street of the Zona Río, the business and shopping district laid out in the 1970s on land reclaimed by the channelization of the Tijuana River, and runs from near the San Ysidro Port of Entry to the southeast of the city. It was previously called Avenida Adolfo López Mateos. Its present name comes from the monuments to figures from Mexican and American history that stand in its roundabouts.

== History ==
Under President Luis Echeverría, the Secretariat of National Patrimony officially began channelizing the Tijuana River on 18 July 1972; the river's natural bed had flooded in the rainy season. The project was planned in three stages. The first covered 160 hectares (400 acres) and 4.5 kilometres (2.8 mi) of channel, from the international border to the railway bridge near the former Agua Caliente resort.

The Zona Río subdivision was authorized in 1975, and its new streets included Bulevar Padre Kino, Avenida Centenario, Paseo de los Héroes, Bulevar Sánchez Taboada and the two expressways that flank the channel. Along the Paseo rose the Tijuana Cultural Center, which opened in 1982 at the corner of Avenida Mina, the Plaza Río Tijuana mall, opened in 1981, the Plaza del Zapato, hotels, banks and office buildings. By 1989 San Diego Magazine described the avenue as Tijuana's "classy shopping and dining row". Tijuana's federal district courts are at number 10540.

The Cuauhtémoc roundabout is a common gathering point. In November 2014 a march in support of the missing Ayotzinapa students went along Paseo de los Héroes and set up an altar at the foot of the monument.

== Monuments ==
Five monuments stand in the avenue's roundabouts (glorietas).

| Monument | Cross street | Year | Sculptor | Notes |
|---|---|---|---|---|
| Mexico ("Las Tijeras") | Bulevar Independencia | 1973 | Ángela Gurría | Steel structure in the shape of an "M" |
| Cuauhtémoc | Bulevar Cuauhtémoc | 1975 | Alfonso Casarrubias Parra | Gift of the state of Guerrero |
| Abraham Lincoln | Avenida Diego Rivera | 1981 | Humberto Peraza | Gift of the United States government |
| Ignacio Zaragoza | Bulevar Abelardo L. Rodríguez | 1976 | Antonio Castellanos Basich | |
| Lázaro Cárdenas | Bulevar Sánchez Taboada | | | Facing the Lázaro Cárdenas federal high school |

=== Monumento México ===
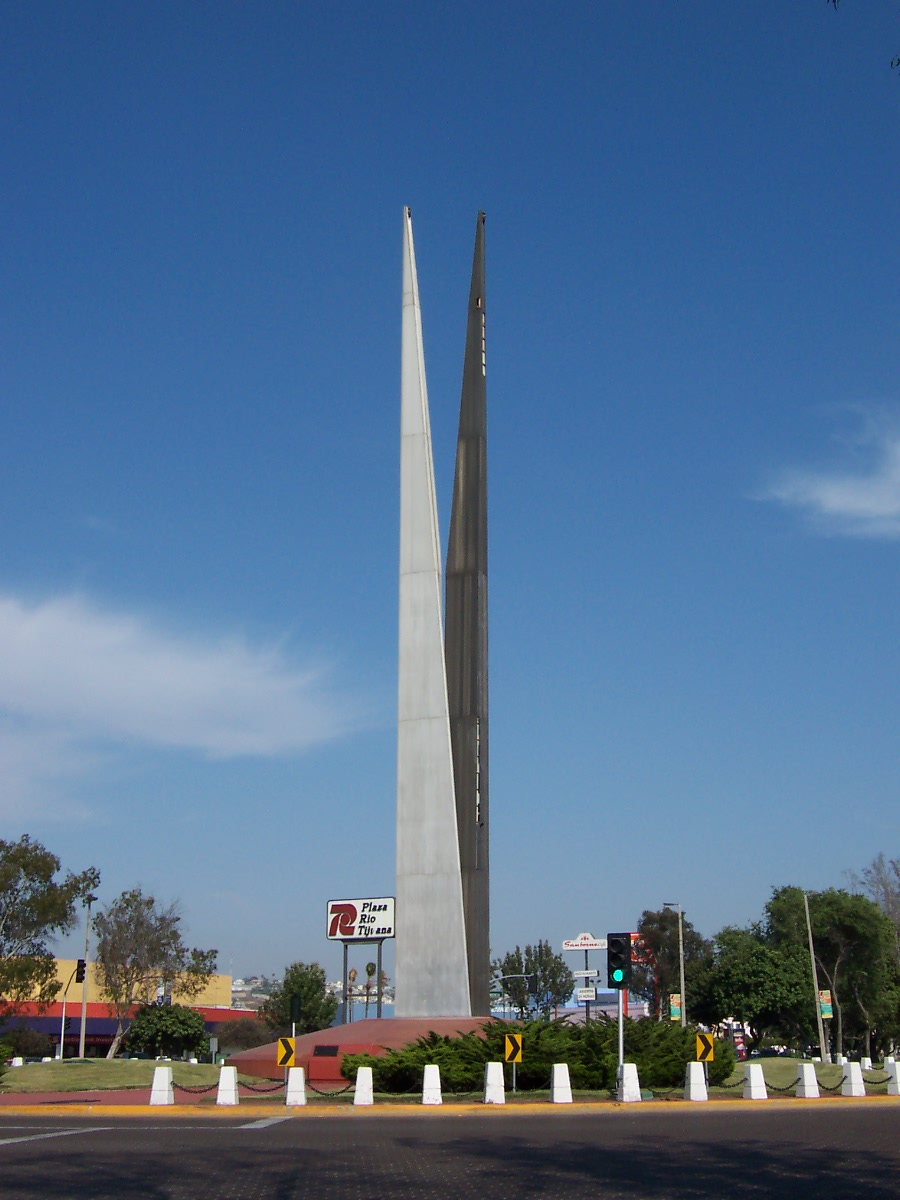
Monumento México in the 2000s

The sculptor Ángela Gurría created the Monumento al Mestizaje (Monument to Mestizaje), now officially the Monumento México, in 1973. A stylized steel "M", it stands in the first major roundabout after the San Ysidro border crossing, at Bulevar Independencia, between the Tijuana Cultural Center and Plaza Río. San Diego Magazine dates it to 1981.

Its shape has earned it the nickname "Las Tijeras" (the scissors).

=== Cuauhtémoc ===
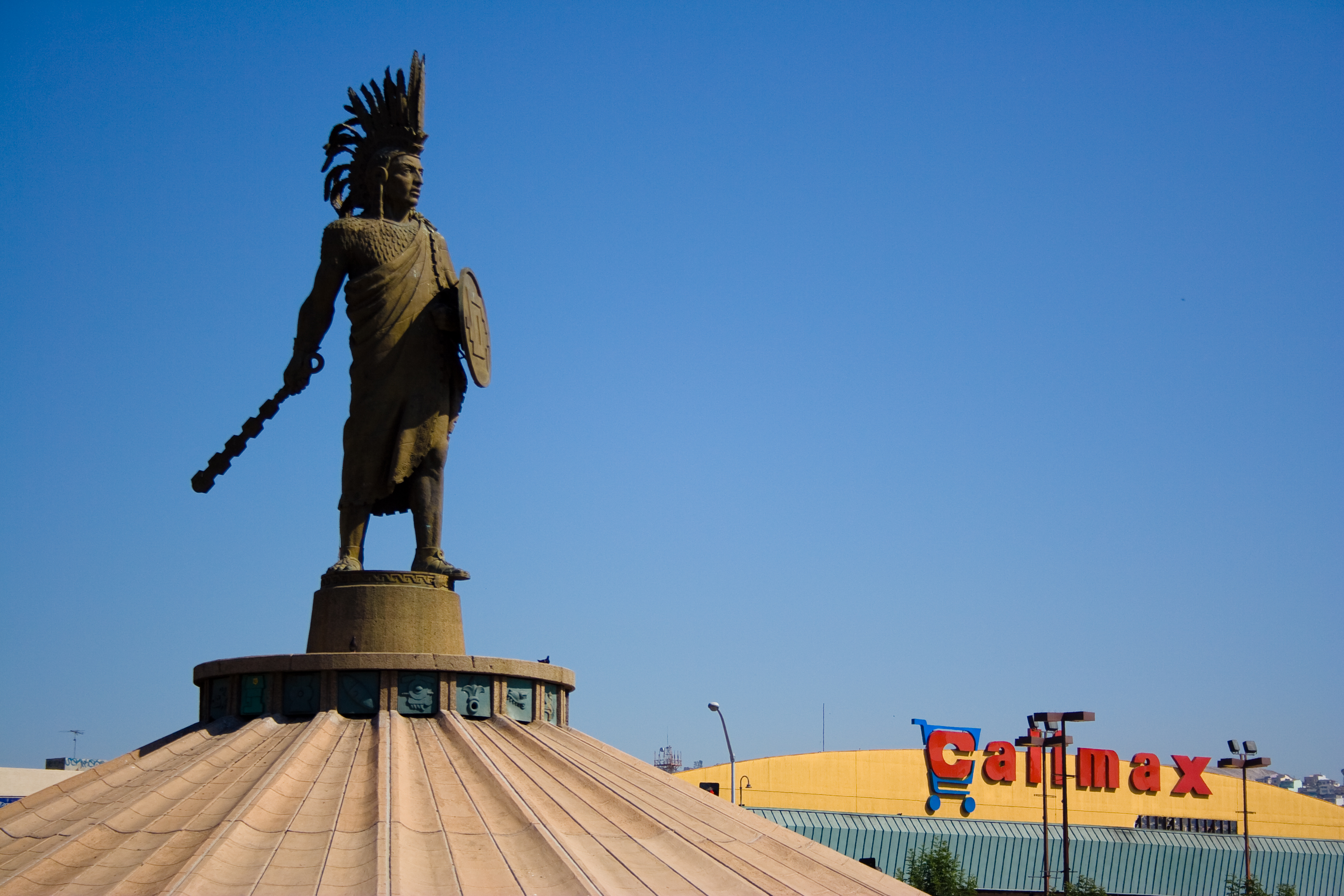
The Cuauhtémoc monument in 2008

The statue of Cuauhtémoc, the last Aztec huey tlatoani (1520–1521), stands on a pyramid-shaped base in the second roundabout coming from the United States, at Bulevar Cuauhtémoc. It is the work of the Guerrero sculptor Alfonso Casarrubias Parra; the Guerrero state government gave it to the city of Tijuana, and it was installed in 1975. San Diego Magazine gives the year as 1977 and notes that the figure faces north, toward the United States.

=== Abraham Lincoln ===
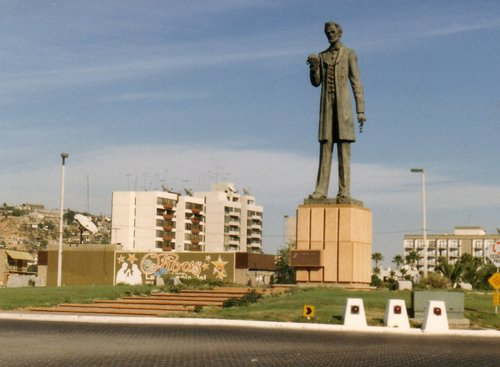
The Lincoln monument

The statue of Abraham Lincoln, at Avenida Diego Rivera, was unveiled on 21 June 1981. It was part of an exchange agreed by presidents Ronald Reagan and José López Portillo to recall the friendship between Lincoln and Benito Juárez: the United States paid the Yucatán sculptor Humberto Peraza for the Lincoln statue, and Mexico commissioned Ernesto Tamariz to make a statue of Juárez for Pantoja Park in San Diego. Lincoln is shown standing and breaking a chain, a reference to the abolition of slavery. The geographers Daniel Arreola and James Curtis included a photograph of the statue in their study of Mexico's northern border cities.

When it was unveiled, some residents questioned why an American hero stood on an avenue dedicated to Mexican figures. Emmanuel Robles, director of the Tijuana historical archive, has pointed out that Lincoln, as a congressman, opposed the Mexican–American War.

=== Ignacio Zaragoza ===
The monument to General Ignacio Zaragoza, who defeated the French at the Battle of Puebla in 1862, stands in the roundabout at Bulevar Abelardo L. Rodríguez. It is the work of Antonio Castellanos Basich and dates from 1976. Zaragoza had no direct connection with the city, but in 1925 President Plutarco Elías Calles created the municipality under the name Zaragoza in his honor. Residents kept calling it Tijuana, and the official name was changed back in 1929.

=== Lázaro Cárdenas ===
The monument to former president Lázaro Cárdenas stands on the last stretch of the avenue, near Bulevar Sánchez Taboada, facing the Lázaro Cárdenas federal high school. The school occupies the grounds of the former Agua Caliente resort, which Cárdenas's government closed in 1935 when it banned gambling.
