= Grand Hotel Tijuana =

Plaza Aguacaliente & Grand Hotel Tijuana
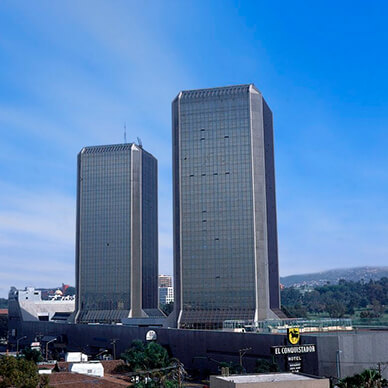
- View of Las Torres
- Interactive map of the Plaza Aguacaliente & Grand Hotel Tijuana area

General information
- Type: Mixed-use: Office, Commercial center, Hotel
- Location: Zona Rio, Tijuana
- Coordinates: 32.513094°N 117.008239°W
- Construction started: 1979
- Completed: 1982
- Opening: 1982

Height
- Roof: 89.9 metres (295 ft)

Technical details
- Floor count: 28

The Plaza Aguacaliente & Grand Hotel Tijuana (commonly known by locals as Las Torres) is a mixed-use high-rise building complex of twin skyscrapers in Tijuana, Mexico. With a height of 89.9 meters (295 feet) to the top floor, and 28 stories, they were the tallest buildings in Tijuana and Baja California upon completion in 1982 and were among the first skyscrapers constructed in the city.

== History ==
The towers were developed by the Bustamante family, a traditional family of the city and among the initial developers of the city, including the partial development in the mid-60's of Playas de Tijuana.

It was previously known as the Hotel Fiesta Americana, but it was later renamed to Grand Hotel Tijuana, sometime around 1990.

== Design ==
The complex consists of two towers, east and west towers, linked by two floor levels. East tower, Grand Hotel Tower I, is mainly for commercial purposes, while west tower, Grand Hotel Tower II, is home for the five-star grand hotel. This means that the brand offers high standards of comfort and quality, and there is a high staff-to-guest ratio. The complex is located within the central business district of Tijuana, Zona Rio.

== Gallery ==
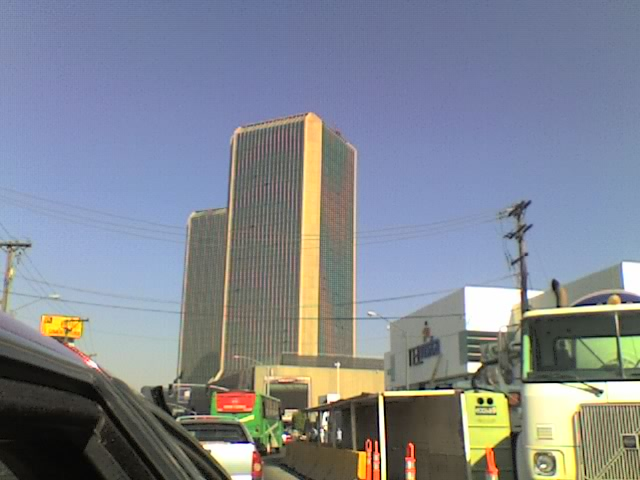

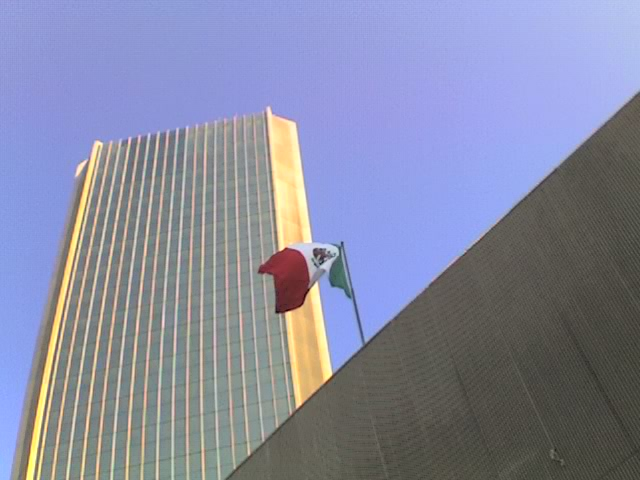
Grand Hotel Tower I with the Flag of Mexico

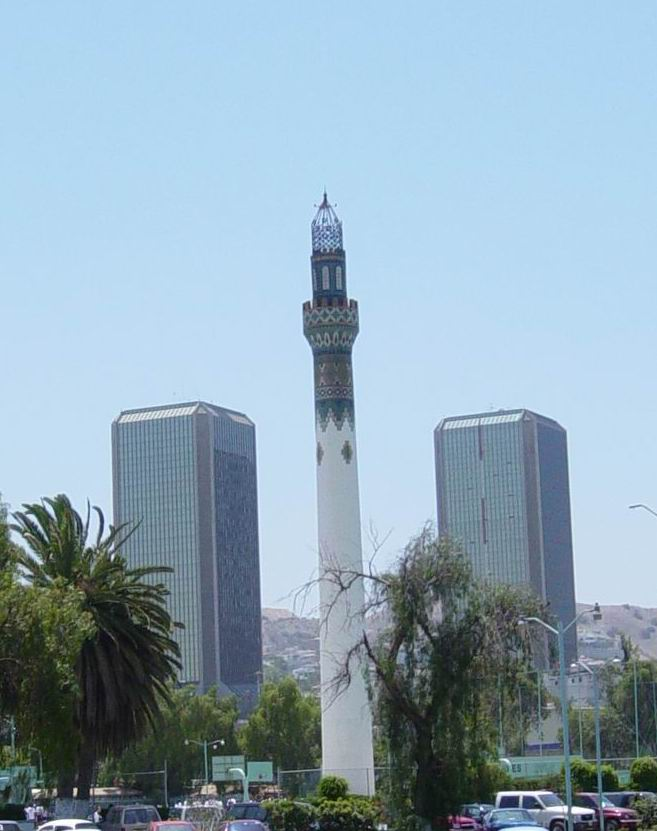
View of Las Torres at background of the Aguacaliente Minaret

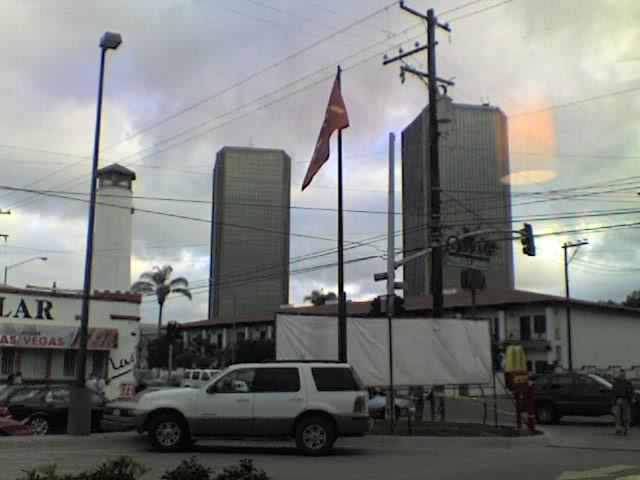
Las Torres by day

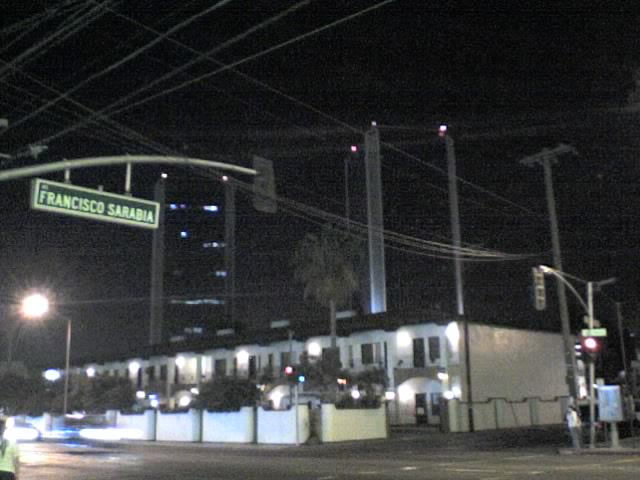
Las Torres by night

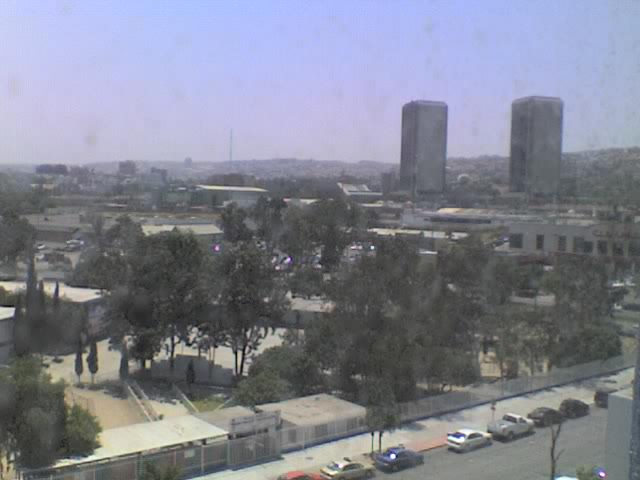
Las Torres, seen from Hospital Angeles Tijuana

== See also ==
- List of hotels in Mexico
- List of companies of Mexico
- List of tallest buildings in Tijuana

Preceded by none	Tallest completed building in Tijuana; 1982-present	Succeeded by incumbent
Preceded by Aguacaliente Minaret	Tallest structure in Tijuana; 1982-2008	Succeeded by New City Residential
