= Humberto Peraza =

Mexican sculptor (1925–2016)

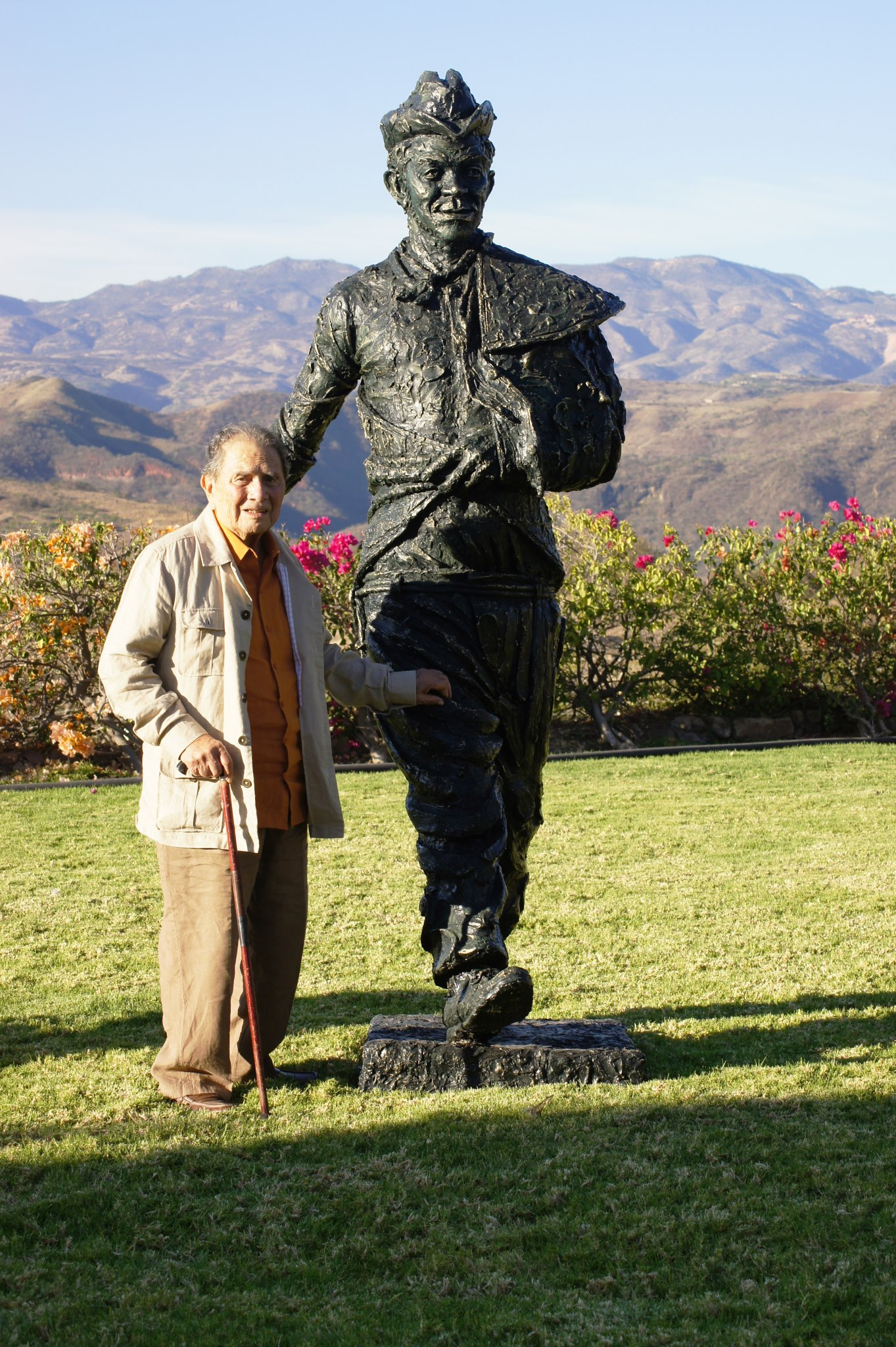
- Peraza beside his statue of Cantinflas at the Plaza México
- Born: Humberto Peraza y Ojeda; 4 December 1925; Mérida, Yucatán, Mexico
- Died: 28 May 2016 (aged 90); Cuernavaca, Morelos, Mexico
- Education: Academy of San Carlos (UNAM)
- Known for: Sculpture, especially bullfighting subjects and public monuments
- Notable work: Lázaro Cárdenas monument (Eje Central, Mexico City); Abraham Lincoln monument (Tijuana); Pegasus fountain, National Palace
- Spouse: Angelina Ávila Montoya (m. 1954)
- Relatives: Sergio Peraza (son)

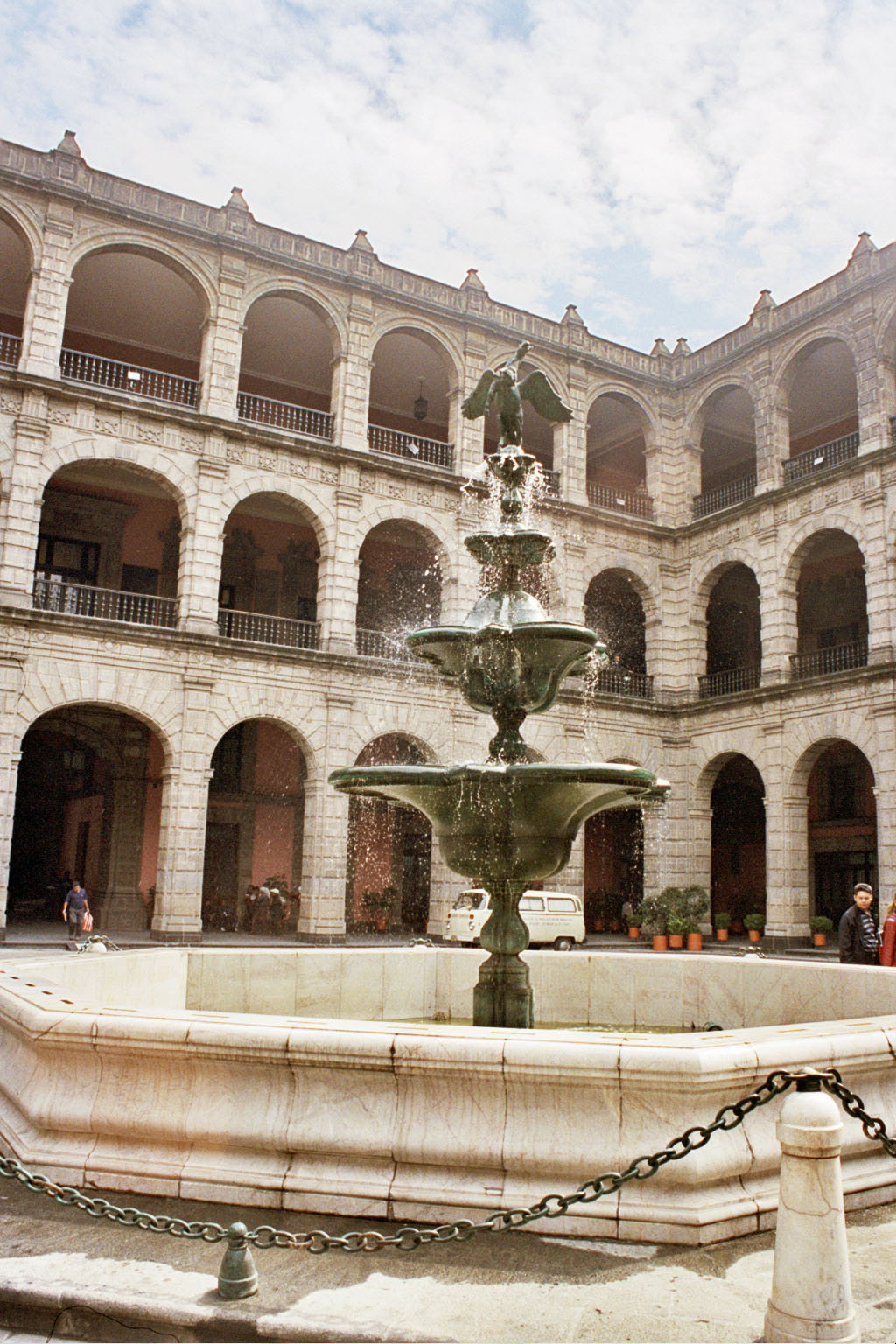
The Pegasus fountain in the National Palace

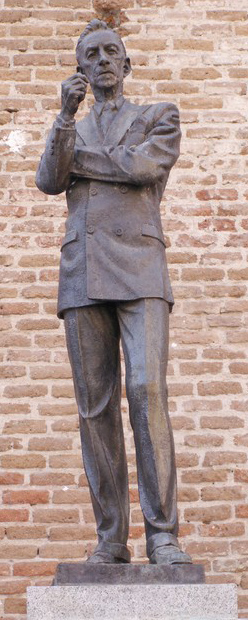
Statue of Agustín Lara in Madrid

Humberto Peraza y Ojeda (4 December 1925 – 28 May 2016), known as Humberto Peraza, was a Mexican sculptor. He was best known for bronzes of bullfighting subjects, which earned him a reputation as Mexico's leading taurine sculptor, and for public monuments including the statue of Lázaro Cárdenas on Mexico City's Eje Central and the statue of Abraham Lincoln on Tijuana's Paseo de los Héroes.

== Early life and training ==
Peraza was born in Mérida, Yucatán, to Andrés Peraza Lara and Trinidad Ojeda. According to his family he made his first sculpture, a wax parrot, as a small child. As a young man he wanted to be a bullfighter and fought as an amateur. At 19 he talked his way into a job as an assistant to the Spanish-born sculptor Alfredo Just, who was making the bullfighter statues for the new Plaza México in Mexico City, by claiming to be a sculptor. Just fired him when he found out, but Peraza kept coming back, won the sculptor's trust and learned the trade from him. He entered the Academy of San Carlos of the National Autonomous University of Mexico in 1948 and graduated in fine arts in 1954.

== Career ==
Bullfighting remained Peraza's main subject. He made bronzes of matadors including Fermín Espinosa "Armillita", Lorenzo Garza, Carlos Arruza, Juan Silveti, Eloy Cavazos and Rodolfo Gaona, produced the series La Tauromaquia, and designed the trophies for the Domecq awards at the Plaza México. In 1959 he founded a club for amateur bullfighters, the Peña de Aficionados Prácticos.

His first major public commission was an equestrian statue of General Joaquín Amaro for the Campo Marte in Mexico City, which he won in a 1958 competition. He went on to make about 52 large-scale monuments in Mexico and abroad. These include the Pegasus fountain in the central courtyard of the National Palace and a statue of the Maya goddess Ixchel, commissioned by Yucatán governor Carlos Loret de Mola; the statue later went to Los Pinos and then to the home of former president José López Portillo.

In 1981 the United States government commissioned Peraza to make a statue of Abraham Lincoln for Tijuana, as part of an exchange agreed by presidents Ronald Reagan and López Portillo; Mexico in turn sent a statue of Benito Juárez by Ernesto Tamariz to Pantoja Park in San Diego. Unveiled on 21 June 1981, the Lincoln statue shows him standing and breaking a chain. His best-known work in Mexico City is the monument to Lázaro Cárdenas on the Eje Central.

Later works include Quijote en las nubes (1989), a Don Quixote on horseback in the first section of Chapultepec park, and a statue of the songwriter Agustín Lara in the Lavapiés district of Madrid, inaugurated in 2001, which shows Lara with arms crossed, looking toward the horizon. With his son Sergio Peraza he made the statue of the comedian Cantinflas that stands inside the Plaza México. Peraza later proposed restoring the bullring's ageing statues by Just with modern methods, but the plaza's management did not take up the offer.

Beyond bronze, he carved more than 100 stone sculptures and produced oil paintings, watercolors and gouaches; his dealer, Galería Divart, put his bronze castings at more than 3,000.

== Selected public works ==
Year	Work	Location
1958	Equestrian statue of General Joaquín Amaro	Campo Marte, Mexico City
	Pegasus fountain	Central courtyard, National Palace, Mexico City
	Ixchel	Formerly at Los Pinos
1981	Abraham Lincoln	Paseo de los Héroes, Tijuana
	Lázaro Cárdenas	Eje Central, Mexico City
1989	Quijote en las nubes	Chapultepec, Mexico City
	Cantinflas (with Sergio Peraza)	Plaza México, Mexico City
2001	Agustín Lara	Lavapiés, Madrid

== Recognition ==
Peraza won six national sculpture competitions and received 13 gold medals over his career. In 1971 his home city of Mérida named him a favorite son (hijo predilecto).

== Personal life and death ==
Peraza married Angelina Ávila Montoya in 1954. Peraza died of a heart attack at his home in Cuernavaca on the night of 28 May 2016, at the age of 90, while watching his favorite film, Belmonte. His ashes were placed in a niche with a statue of Francis of Assisi.
