= Centro Médico Excel =

Hospital Excel (Centro Médico Excel)
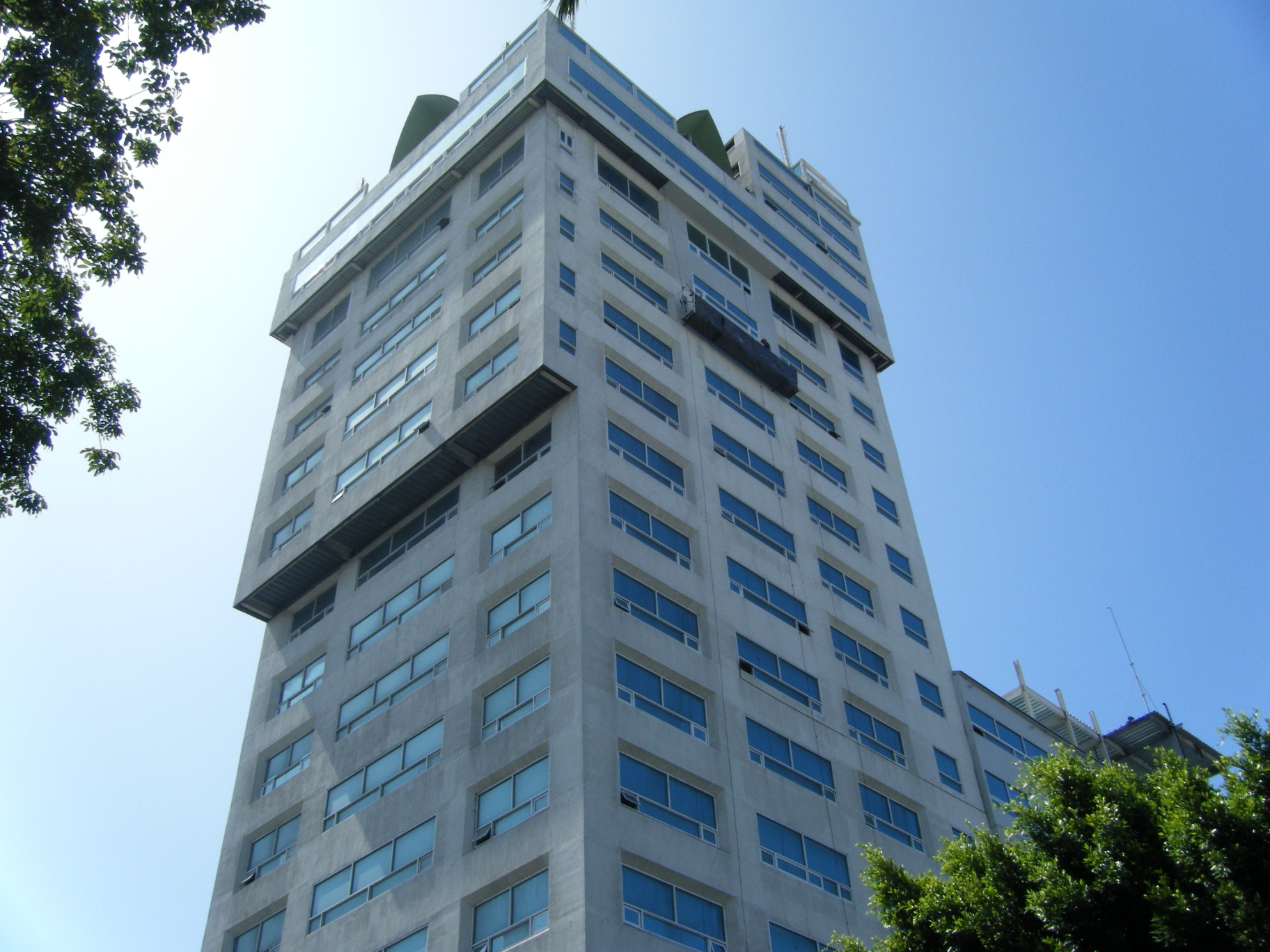
- View of Excel Hospital
- Interactive map of the Hospital Excel (Centro Médico Excel) area

General information
- Type: Mixed-use: Medical center, Office
- Location: Zona Rio, Tijuana
- Coordinates: 32°31′16″N 117°0′42″W
- Construction started: 1991
- Completed: 2018
- Opening: 1991
- Owner

Height
- Roof: 69 metres (226 ft)

Technical details
- Floor count: 22

Centro Médico Excel (Excel Medical Center), or Hospital Excel (Excel Hospital) is a mixed-use skyscraper in Tijuana, Mexico. One of the prominent buildings in the city, it is the 11th tallest building in Tijuana.

It is located within Zona Río, the central business district of Tijuana.

== History ==
The founder of this center is Dr. Jose Hernandez Fujigaki, a cardiovascular and thoracic surgeon from California. Excel Hospital performed the first open heart surgery program in Baja California, Mexico. The increase of medical tourism in Tijuana as well as the demand for medical centers in the city have made the hospital transform into a multi-building medical center, currently consisting of Building A (tallest building, blue in color, has the name of the hospital at its top) and Building B (orange in color). Today, it remains as the largest, multispecialty private hospital in Tijuana. Its heart program has grown to be the strongest in northwestern Mexico.

Recent additions have turned it into a 22-story multi-building hospital and one of the largest medical centers in Tijuana. Due to its growth and the increasing demand for medical tourism and services in Tijuana, a third building (dubbed “Building C” as a placeholder) is currently under construction. The building is planned to have 34 stories for parking, doctor’s offices and more ancillary services for the medical community in the city when completed.

== Use ==
Excel Medical Center serves primarily as hospital and as a medical tourism hub. In addition to hospital space, the building maintains space for offices housing the hospital's management areas.

The center specializes in comprehensive medical procedures such as:

- Mammography & Radiology
- Cardiac Catheterization Laboratory
- Cardiac Stress Testing
- Non-invasive Cardiology
- 9 Operating Rooms
- 15 Intensive Care Suites (U.S. Standards)
- Telemetry Monitoring
- Heart Surgery
- Pulmonary Surgery
- Obstetrics and Gynecology
- Prostate Surgery
- Hip and Knee Replacement
- Gastric Bypass Surgery
- Spine Surgery
- Pediatric Orthopaedics
- Oncology Surgery and Treatment
- Cosmetic Surgery
- Breast Augmentation or Reduction
- Dentistry, Implants
- Traumatology and Orthopaedics
- Physical Rehabilitation
- Pulmonary Therapy
- MRI and Tomography
- Emergency Care
- Intensive Care

== See also ==
- List of tallest buildings in Tijuana
