= List of tallest buildings in Tijuana =

This is a list of tallest buildings in the city of Tijuana, Baja California. Tijuana has the most high rises in northern Mexico after Monterrey. The tallest highrise in Tijuana is Newcity Medical Plaza at 130 metres (427 ft)

== Tallest buildings ==
This list ranks Tijuana skyscrapers that stand at least 60 metres (200 ft) tall, based on standard height measurement. This includes spires and architectural details but does not include antenna masts.

Rank	Name	Height	Floors	Year	Ref.
1	Newcity Medical Plaza	130 m (430 ft)	28	2019	
2	Link Torre A	129 m (423 ft)	35	2025	
3	Link Torre B	120 m (390 ft)	33	2025	
4	Sayan Campestre	124 m (407 ft)	32	2019	
5	NewCity Residencial Torre Diamante	102 m (335 ft)	26	2008	
6	New City Diamante Tower	101.8 m (334 ft)	27	2012	
7	Torre de Agua Caliente I	90 m (300 ft)	28	1982	
8	Torre de Agua Caliente II	90 m (300 ft)	24	1982	
9	Grand Hotel Tijuana	90 m (300 ft)	28	1982	
10	Green View	95 m (312 ft)	32	2011	
11	NewCity Residencial-Torre Onix	89 m (292 ft)	29	2012	
12	NewCity Residencial-Torre 2	89 m (292 ft)	25	2008	
13	NewCity Residencial-Torre 3	89 m (292 ft)	25	2015	
14	Adamant tijuana	88 m (289 ft)	25	2017	
15	Centro Medico Excel	70 m (230 ft)	25	2007	
16	Horizonte Luxury Condos A	60 m (200 ft)	17	2017	
17	Horizonte Luxury Condos B	60 m (200 ft)	17	2017	
18	VIA Corporativo	60 m (200 ft)	25	2011	
19	Centura Centro Corporativo	60 m (200 ft)	23	2008	
20	Torre Cosmopolitan	60 m (200 ft)	25	2016	
21	Park Towers	55 m (180 ft)	17	2008	
22	Hospital Angeles Tijuana	49 m (161 ft)	11	2005	

== Tallest under construction and approved ==
Rank	Name	Height	Floors	Year
1	Health District Tijuana	169 m (554 ft)	39	2028
2	Westin Hotel	116 m (381 ft)	28	2027
3	Skyline	100 m (330 ft)	25	2027
4	Sophia	90 m (300 ft)	26	2027

== See also ==
- List of tallest buildings in Monterrey
- List of tallest buildings in Mexico City
- List of tallest buildings in Mexico
- List of tallest buildings in Latin America
- List of tallest buildings in North America
