= Tijuana Christian mission =

The Tijuana Christian Mission is a children's mission based in Tijuana, Baja California, Mexico. The mission was founded in 1964 by Martha López, the current director. The mission has grown in size since its founding, and now includes three Churches and a Children's home.

== History ==
Founded in 1964, the mission was constructed one block from the United States–Mexico border in the city of Tijuana. The original mission goals were to start a church and Bible college; but that soon changed, however, as Sergio Gómez and Martha López noticed the large number of homeless and abused children in the city. The plans for the Church and Bible college were altered to make dormitories for the children. In the mid 1960s until the year 1970, the mission would move from place to place, until finally building a mission at Soler, which is located five miles from Tijuana beach, near the United States–Mexico border. In the Year 2007, the mission directors decided to move the children to the site at Rosarito, also known as City of Refuge at Hacienda Victoria.

== Today ==
The mission has grown substantially since its founding, now including the soler site, three churches and children's home. A new mission is currently under construction in the nearby city of Rosarito.
