= Park Towers (Tijuana) =

Park Towers by the Sea
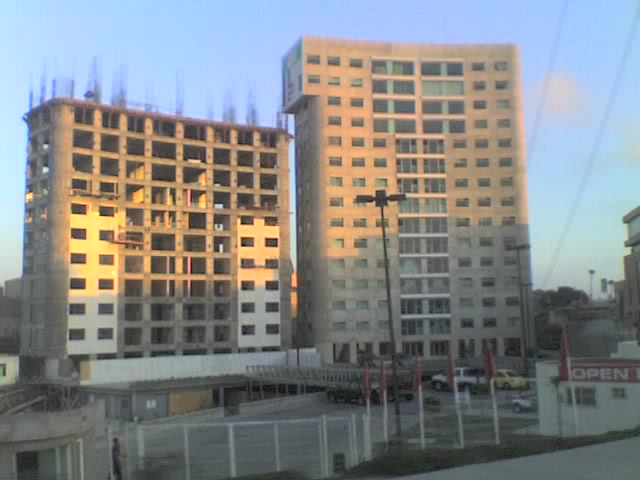
- Park Towers under construction
- Interactive map of the Park Towers by the Sea area

General information
- Type: Luxury condominiums
- Location: Tijuana
- Coordinates: 32°31′53″N 117°7′6″W
- Construction started: 2006
- Completed: 2008

Height
- Roof: 55 metres (180 ft)

Technical details
- Floor count: 17

Park Towers by the Sea are a set of four residential highrise buildings in Tijuana, Baja California, Mexico. Located in the Playas de Tijuana area of the city, Park Towers are the first prominent fixtures on the metropolitan Tijuana coastline north of Rosarito Beach. Upon completion of the first tower, the complex became the 10th tallest buildings in the city.

== History ==
Park Towers were developed as a luxury residence.

== Design ==
The towers are residential buildings with a modern style. They are composed primarily of glass and reinforced concrete. The towers originally consisted of 2 residential buildings which are white in color. A third and fourth building are currently under construction. These new buildings have a new modern exterior design which distinguishes them from the original 2 towers.

== See also ==
- List of tallest buildings in Tijuana
