= Hospital Angeles Tijuana =

Coordinates: 32.5179°N 117.0079°W

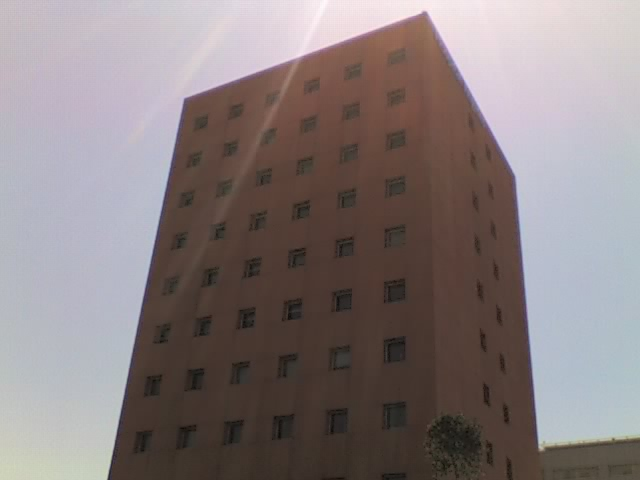
- Interactive map of the Hospital Angeles Tijuana area

General information
- Type: Mixed-use: Medical center, Office
- Location: Zona Rio, Tijuana
- Construction started: 2002
- Completed: 2004
- Opening: 2005
- Owner: Grupo Angeles
- Operator: Grupo Angeles

Height
- Roof: 49 metres (161 ft)

Technical details
- Floor count: 11
- Floor area: 29,108 metres (95,499 ft)

Hospital Angeles Tijuana is a mixed-use high-rise building and prominent fixture in Tijuana, Mexico. It serves as the primary hospital of Tijuana. The building includes office space as well as the main hospital which is located within a complex composed of another building, a 5-story tower, which on its roof has a heliport, being the first hospital in the city with such a feature.

It is located within the central business district of Tijuana, Zona Rio.

== Gallery ==
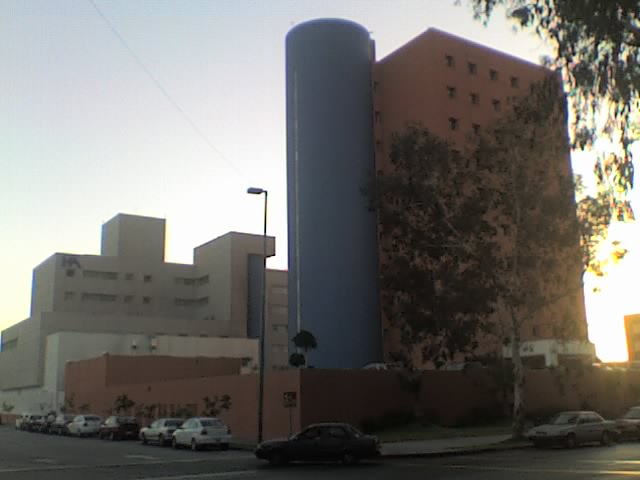

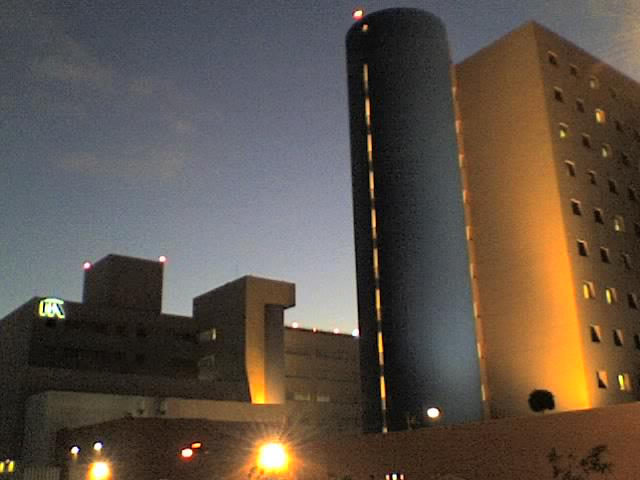

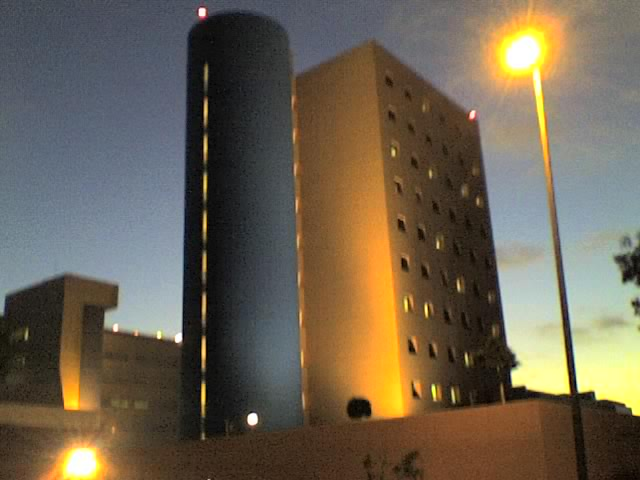

== See also ==
- List of tallest buildings in Tijuana
