= VIA Corporativo =

General information
- Type: Office
- Location: Rio Zone, Tijuana
- Completed: 2009
- Owner: Green Nevada Capital Funds

Height
- Roof: 60 metres (197 ft)

Technical details
- Floor count: 14
- Floor area: 22,700 m^{2} (244,000 sq ft)

Design and construction
- Architect: Guillot Arquitectos

VIA Corporativo is a prominent office skyscraper in the Rio Zone of Tijuana, Baja California. The building was completed in 2009 and is among the tallest in the city, being the 9th tallest in the city. One of the most modern buildings in Tijuana, it was developed by Ramón Guillot Lapiedra / Estudio ARG and cost $12 million to construct.

== Architecture ==
The project is based on the idea of flow and motion. Guillot Arquitectos studios created a design with office areas, service areas, and natural light and air circulation that incorporates shifting patterns and plane play in different levels to form a central space - the chamber of light and air. This feature acts like a central artery in the building, distributing air based on the dominant winds and directing natural light into the interior areas.

The building received its LEED Golden Certificate in 2010.

== See also ==
- List of tallest buildings in Tijuana
