= La Presa (borough) =

- Borough (Delegación) of Tijuana
- Delegación La Presa
- Interactive map of La Presa
- Coordinates: 32.468236°N 116.804315°W
- Country: Mexico
- State: Baja California
- Municipality (municipio): Tijuana
- Area code: 664

La Presa is a borough of the municipality of Tijuana in Baja California, Mexico. The La Presa borough is named after the Abelardo L. Rodríguez Dam ("Presa" means "Dam" in English), but actually does not include the dam within its boundaries. The borough should not be confused with the neighborhoods (colonias) that have La Presa in their name northwest of the dam; those form part of the La Mesa borough. La Presa borough includes the El Florido industrial park and several neighborhoods with El Florido in the name. La Presa borough is bordered by Centenario (borough) on the north and Cerro Colorado (borough) on the west.
