= Villa del Campo =

Villa del Campo may refer to:

- Villa del Campo, Baja California, Mexico
- Villa del Campo, Cáceres, Spain
