= Tijuana Municipality =

Municipality in the Mexican state of Baja California

- Municipality
- Municipio de Tijuana; Municipality of Tijuana
- Coat of arms
- Motto: The Fatherland Starts Here
- Location of Tijuana in Baja California
- Coordinates: 32°32′N 117°3′W
- Country: United Mexican States
- State: Baja California
- Municipal seat: Tijuana
- Largest city: Tijuana
- Municipality established: December 29, 1953

Government
  - Body: Ayuntamiento
  - Mayor: Montserrat Caballero (MORENA)

Area
  - Total: 879.2 km^{2} (339.5 sq mi)

Population (2020)
  - Total: 1,922,523
  - Density: 2,187/km^{2} (5,660/sq mi)
- Data source:
- Time zone: UTC−08:00 (Zona Noroeste)
  - Summer (DST): UTC−07:00 (DST)
- Area code: +52 664/663
- INEGI code: 004
- Website: (in Spanish) Ayuntamiento de Tijuana

Tijuana Municipality is a municipality in the Mexican state of Baja California. Its municipal seat is located in the city of Tijuana. According to the 2020 census, the municipality had a population of 1,922,523, making it the most populous municipality in the country. Montserrat Caballero of the MORENA is the current mayor. The municipality comprises the largest part of the Tijuana metropolitan area.

Tijuana is bordered to the south by the municipalities of Rosarito Beach and Ensenada; to the east, by the municipality of Tecate; to the west, by the Pacific Ocean; and to the north, by the international border with the United States, specifically the County of San Diego, California. The area of the municipality of Tijuana is 879.2 km^{2} (339.46 sq mi); the municipality includes part of the Coronado Islands, located off the coast of the municipality in the Pacific Ocean.

The city of Tijuana lies just south of San Diego, California. The adjacent city and former borough of Tijuana is Rosarito Beach.

== Boroughs ==
The municipality of Tijuana is divided into nine administrative boroughs, or delegaciones with "Resto de Municipio" the remaining unincorporated Part of the Municipality being the largest borough. The Tijuana metropolitan area occupies all of borough seats. The boroughs are in turn divided into colonias or ejidos. These boroughs offer administrative services such as urban planning, civil registry, inspection, verification, public works and community development and are served by a delegado.

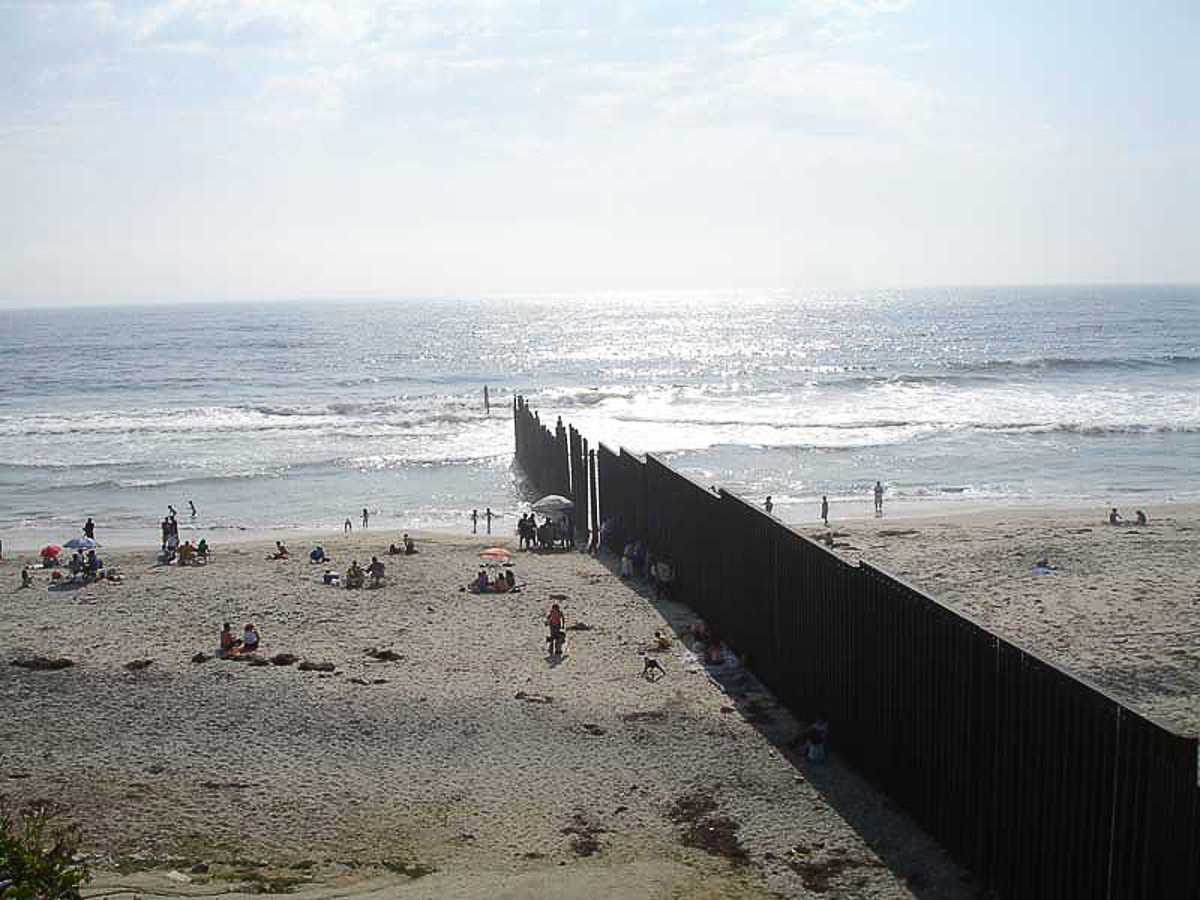
View of the U.S.–Mexico border fence from Playas de Tijuana, at the left

- Centro — "Delegación Centro" includes the old downtown (Zona Centro), new business district (Zona Río), and other adjacent neighborhoods ("zonas"). This is the historical midpoint of Tijuana; the municipal palace is located here as well as most of the tourist zones, such as Avenida Revolución and the business district. The Tijuana Cultural Center (CECUT for CEntro CUltural de Tijuana) is located here as well as the Plaza Río Tijuana, until recently the largest mall in the state, within the Zona Rio.
- Cerro Colorado — The Cerro Colorado ("Red Hill") is located here and it is surrounded by houses. Because of its height many of the area's antennae for radio and television stations are located on its peak.
- La Mesa — This is where the Morelos Park, the largest public park in the city, is located, as well as the Plaza Mundo Divertido, the new Macroplaza and the CETYS University.
- Otay Centenario — This borough was created in 2014 by merging Mesa de Otay and Centenario boroughs. In this borough sits the Tijuana International Airport. The Tijuana campus of the Autonomous University of Baja California and the Technologico are also located here as well as many maquiladoras. This is the borough with the largest number of factories and maquiladoras. Its largest colony is Ciudad Industrial ("Industrial City"). Three of the city's most important streets, Boulevard Bellas Artes, Boulevard Industrial and Mexican Federal Highway 2, are located here. The Otay Mesa Port of Entry and the Parque de la Amistad park are also here.
- Playas de Tijuana — This is the westernmost borough of the city bordered by the Pacific Ocean on the west and the United States border on the north. This is where the beaches of Tijuana are located (hence the name) and it is also one of the two exits to the south towards Rosarito and Ensenada.
- La Presa — This is the largest borough in size and the Abelardo L. Rodríguez Dam is located within its limits, hence its name ("Presa" translates as "Dam" in English). The new Corredor Tijuana 2000 s and the Tijuana-Tecate free road run through it.
- San Antonio de los Buenos — This is mostly a residential area although it also has two industrial parks.
- Sanchez Taboada — Like the previous borough this is mostly a residential area, but within its borders are located many "maquiladoras" specially at Pacific Industrial Park.
- La Presa Este — Like the previous borough this is mostly a residential area.
- Resto de Municipio — (Translates to Rest of Municipality) Largest Delegation which is mainly rural with small towns located on the southernmost area of unincorporated Part of the Municipality.

== Demographics ==
Historical population
Year	Pop.	±%
2000	1,210,820	—
2005	1,410,700	+16.5%
2010	1,559,683	+10.6%
2015	1,641,570	+5.3%
2020	1,922,523	+17.1%

As of 2020, the municipality had a total population of 1,922,523.

As of 2010, the city of Tijuana had a population of 1,300,983. Other than the city of Tijuana, the municipality had 902 localities, the largest of which (with 2010 populations in parentheses) were: El Refugio (36,400), Pórticos de San Antonio (34,234), La Joya (26,860), Terrazas del Valle (20,421), Villa del Prado Secunda Sección (18,226), Las Delicias (15,486), Villa del Campo (13,906), Villa del Prado (12,303), El Niño (8,999), San Luis (8,571), Maclovio Rojas (7,279), Quinta del Cedro (5,704), Parajes del Valle (3,595), Lomas del Valle (3,352), Los Valles (3,135), classified as urban, and Ejido Javier Rojo Gómez (2,408), Hacienda los Venados (2,096), Buenos Aires (1,761), Cuesta Blanca (1,591), Ejido Ojo de Agua (1,241), San Antonio (1,241), La Esperanza (Granjas Familiares) (1,173), Colinas del Sol (1,145), and Lomas de Tlatelolco (1,086), classified as rural.
