= Bengie Molina =

Puerto Rican baseball player (born 1974)

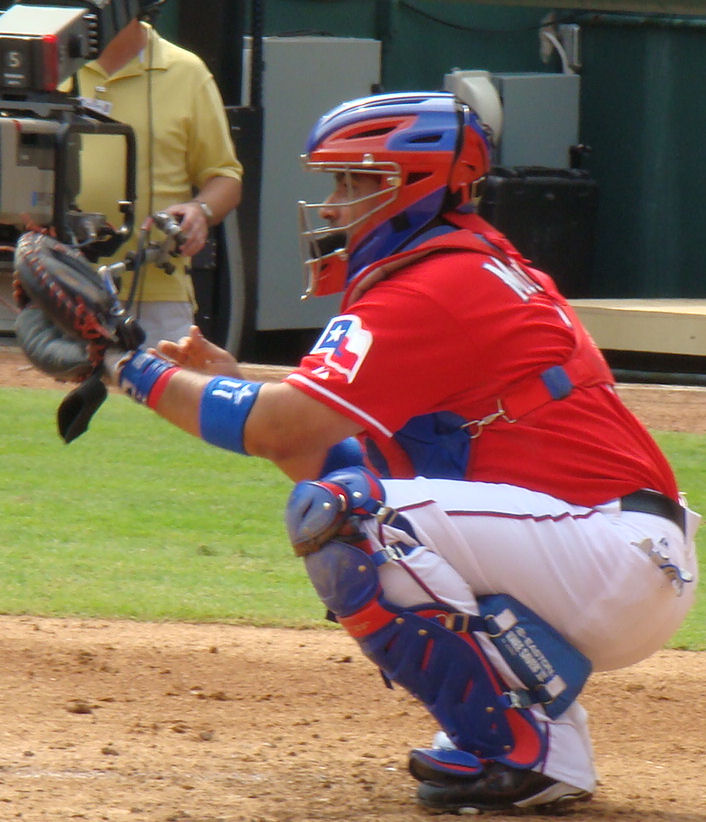
- Molina with the Texas Rangers in 2010
- Catcher
- Born: July 20, 1974 (age 52); Río Piedras, Puerto Rico
- Batted: Right Threw: Right

MLB debut
- September 21, 1998, for the Anaheim Angels

Last MLB appearance
- October 3, 2010, for the Texas Rangers

MLB statistics
- Batting average: .274
- Home runs: 144
- Runs batted in: 711
- Stats at Baseball Reference

Teams
- As player: Anaheim Angels / Los Angeles Angels of Anaheim (1998–2005); Toronto Blue Jays (2006); San Francisco Giants (2007–2010); Texas Rangers (2010); As coach: St. Louis Cardinals (2013); Texas Rangers (2014)

Career highlights and awards
- World Series champion (2002); 2× Gold Glove Award (2002, 2003)

Benjamin José Molina (born July 20, 1974), nicknamed "Big Money", is a Puerto Rican sports commentator and former professional baseball player who is the Spanish radio color analyst for the St. Louis Cardinals of Major League Baseball (MLB). He played 13 seasons as a catcher in MLB for the Anaheim Angels / Los Angeles Angels of Anaheim, Toronto Blue Jays, San Francisco Giants, and Texas Rangers. He is the older brother of major league catchers José Molina and Yadier Molina.

Molina played a handful of games for the Anaheim Angels in 1998 and 1999. He became the Angels' regular catcher in 2000 and remained so through the 2005 season. In 2001, José became his teammate. In 2002, he became a World Series Champion when the Angels defeated the Giants in seven games. He won a Gold Glove in 2002 and 2003, leading American League (AL) catchers in percentage of attempted base stealers thrown out.

A free agent after the 2005 season, Molina sought a long-term contract but settled for a one-year deal with the Blue Jays, criticizing the Angels for not re-signing him. In 2007, he joined the Giants, replacing Mike Matheny. He won the team's Willie Mac Award in 2007 and 2008, set a career-high with 95 runs batted in (RBI) in 2008, and hit a career-high 20 home runs in 2009. Replaced by Buster Posey during the 2010 season, Molina was traded to the Rangers, reaching the World Series where the Giants this time defeated his team. Though regarded as one of the slowest baserunners of his day, Molina drew praise from many of the pitchers he caught for his skills at defense and calling a game. The Molinas are the only three brothers in MLB history to all win World Series rings. Bengie and José did it together as members of the 2002 Anaheim Angels, and Yadier with the 2006 and 2011 Cardinals. José later won a second ring with the 2009 New York Yankees. Bengie also received a ring for the Giants victory in 2010, since he played part of the season for the Giants before being traded to the Texas Rangers who lost the World Series against the Giants.

Following his playing career, Molina served as a coach with the St. Louis Cardinals in 2013 and the Rangers in 2014. In 2016, he became the color commentator on the Spanish language radio broadcast for the Cardinals.

== Early life ==
Benjamin José Molina, Jr., was born on July 20, 1974, in Río Piedras, Puerto Rico, to Gladys Matta and Benjamín Molina Sr., the oldest of three boys. He attended Maestro Ladislao Martínez High School in Vega Alta, graduating with honors. As baseball in Puerto Rico is a significant part of the island's culture, Molina's father played second base as an amateur and worked as a tools technician 10 hours per day in a Westinghouse factory. The all-time hits leader in Liga de Béisbol Profesional Roberto Clemente (or Doble-A Beísbol) history, the elder Molina delivered a .320 career batting average and gained election to the Puerto Rican Baseball Hall of Fame in 2002. Molina's two younger brothers, José and Yadier, also materialized into distinguished defensive catchers with lengthy careers in Major League Baseball (MLB), and each of the three won at least one World Series championship.

Each day when he completed work, Molina's father went directly home, ate dinner with his family, and crossed the street from his family's home with his sons and his son's friend Carlos Diaz to Jesús Mambe Kuilan Park, spending the evening hours teaching them the fundamentals of the sport. Bengie Sr. remained hopeful that his sons would become professional baseball players. Bengie Jr. was not a catcher growing up; his primary positions were outfielder and pitcher.

== College career ==
After graduating high school, Molina came to the mainland United States. He enrolled at Arizona Western College (AWC) in Yuma in 1991, joining the school's baseball team that year. Needing a shortstop, the AWC Matadors moved Molina to the position. "He was really skinny," remembered Matadors coach John Stratton. "He's just turned 18. And he was not a slow baserunner. He wasn't a burner, but he was very athletic and a decent runner." Molina was named an All-Conference shortstop. He also pitched some for the Matadors, featuring a fastball and a slider, though the fastball only travelled 85 to 87 miles per hour (137 to 140 km/h). Molina credited Stratton for improving his understanding of what to do in different situations during games. After Molina played two years for the Matadors, Stratton attempted to help him earn a scholarship to the University of North Alabama, but a technicality prevented Molina from attending, and he returned to Puerto Rico.

== Professional career ==
=== Minor leagues ===
On May 21, 1993, scout Ray Poitevint of the Anaheim Angels was in Vega Alta to evaluate José. The boys' mother convinced Poitevint to examine Bengie too, and a workout was arranged. Bengie impressed Poitevint with his ability to hit line drives, but his slow baserunning threatened to be an obstacle to an MLB career. "Here's a catcher's mitt. Why don't you throw down to second base, and we'll see what it looks like?" Poitevint asked. Two days later, the Angels had signed Bengie to a $1,000 contract as a catcher for their organization. Molina said several elements of the shortstop position translated well to catching, such as the needs to throw accurately, block the baseball, and move the hands quickly.

Molina's professional career began in 1993, when he played 27 games for the Rookie-level Arizona League Angels. After serving as a designated hitter for the Cedar Rapids Kernels in 1994, he made it all the way to the Class AAA level in 1995, though he spent most of the season with Class A teams and missed time with a broken wrist. After playing in a career-high 108 games as the Class AA Midland Angels' catcher in 1996, Molina played winter baseball as the third-string catcher for the Indios de Mayagüez in the Puerto Rican winter league. The team's backup catcher taught him so much about how to play the position, Molina later said "That winter with Sal Fasano was like graduate school."

Despite the education he received, Molina was sent down to the Class A advanced Lake Elsinore Storm to begin the 1997 season. "Too many catchers, not enough spots," he said. Nevertheless, following an injury to one of the Midland catchers, Molina was promoted back to Class AA. A hamstring injury limited his playing time. He began the 1998 season with the Class AAA Vancouver Canadians for the first time since 1995, but he was demoted to Midland midseason. Shocked at getting sent down, Molina might have quit baseball, had his father and veteran minor league teammate Jovino Carvajal not implored him to keep playing.

=== Anaheim Angels / Los Angeles Angels of Anaheim (1998–2005) ===
The decision to continue playing brought dividends for Molina later that year. He was not initially a September callup, but when Charlie O'Brien broke his right index finger on September 15, Molina was promoted to the Angels. At this time, the Los Angeles Times referred to him as "Ben" Molina. He made his MLB debut on September 21, playing the final inning of a 9–1 loss to the Texas Rangers. Molina also played one other game for the Angels before the end of the season.

Despite receiving the late-season callup in 1998, Molina had "virtually no chance of making the Angels" out of spring training in 1999, according to the Los Angeles Times. He spent most of the season with the Angels' Class AAA club, now the Edmonton Trappers, batting .286 with 69 hits, seven home runs, and 41 runs batted in (RBI). On August 3, he replaced O'Brien for good, promoted to replace the veteran who was designated for assignment. This time, he started many of the Angels' games. He had four RBI (two apiece) in his first two, then had four RBI on August 19, including his first career home run, which came against Jim Parque in a 9–2 victory over the Chicago White Sox. Molina's season ended on September 16, when he suffered a strained left hamstring while running the bases. In 31 games (101 at bats), he batted .257 with 26 hits, one home run, and 10 RBI.

==== 2000–2001 ====
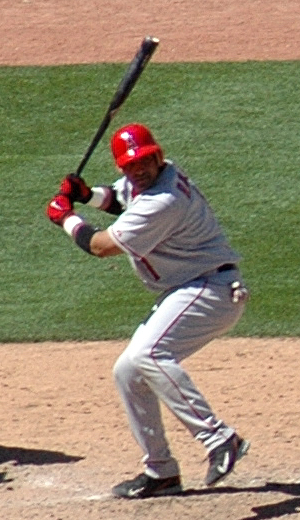
Molina batting for the Angels in 2005.

In 2000, Molina spent spring training competing for the position of starting catcher with Todd Greene, a power hitter who had been viewed as the Angels' catcher of the future a few years before but was struggling offensively, and Matt Walbeck. Greene was released before the start of the season, and Molina won the job. On May 12, he hit two home runs in a game for what would be the only time in his career, scoring four runs and recording four hits as well, though the effort came in a 13–11 loss to the Texas Rangers. The game was the beginning of a 14-game hitting streak lasting through June 2, in which Molina batted .517. Angel manager Mike Scioscia said, "Bengie has absolutely stepped up and done the things we thought he could do. The only question was his durability and stamina, but he definitely has the ability to lead a pitching staff to a championship." In 130 games, Molina batted .281 with 133 hits, 14 home runs, and 71 RBI. His 70 RBI while playing catcher were the most at the position in Angels history. (Note: Molina had one RBI while serving as a designated hitter.) Defensively, he posted a .991 fielding percentage and threw out 37% of attempted base stealers. Molina finished fourth in American League (AL) Rookie of the Year Award voting, behind Kazuhiro Sasaki, Terrence Long, and Mark Quinn.

Prior to the 2001 season, the Angels signed Molina to a four-year contract worth $4.25 million, keeping him under contract through 2004, with a $3 million club option or $100,000 buyout for the 2005 season. Molina remained their starting catcher in 2001. However, he was on the disabled list from May 5 through June 26, having strained his right hamstring. During this time, his brother José replaced him on the Angels' roster, having joined the organization as a free agent over the offseason. "This was our dream as kids – to play baseball in the majors. We never thought we'd be together on the same team," Bengie said. The brothers would remain teammates at the catcher position through the 2005 season, the first siblings to catch for the same MLB team since Amos and Lave Cross caught for the Louisville Colonels in 1887. On August 22 and 23, Bengie had back-to-back four-hit games. In 96 games (325 at bats), he batted .262 with 85 hits, six home runs, and 40 RBI. Defensively, he had a .991 fielding percentage and threw out 32% of attempted base stealers.

==== 2002–2003 ====
In 2002, it was Molina's left hamstring that caused him to go on the disabled list, from July 17 to August 1. Despite the time missed, he still appeared in 122 games. In 428 at bats, he hit .245 with 105 hits, five home runs, and 47 RBI. Defensively, he made one error in 768 chances for a .999 fielding percentage and led AL catchers by throwing out 45% of attempted base stealers. For his contributions, Molina won the Gold Glove Award, ending Iván Rodríguez's string of 10 straight won from 1992 to 2001.

The Angels made the playoffs in 2002 as the AL's wild card entry. Molina started every game at catcher for the Angels in the postseason. He had a two-RBI double against Ramiro Mendoza in Game 4 of the AL Division Series (ALDS), as the Angels defeated the New York Yankees 9–5 to win the series three games to one. Overall, Molina batted .267 with four hits and two RBI in the series. Facing the Minnesota Twins in Game 4 of the AL Championship Series (ALCS), he had a two-RBI triple, his first in two years, against Mike Jackson as the Angels won 7–1. He batted .214 with three hits and two RBI as the Angels defeated the Twins in five games. Against the San Francisco Giants in the World Series, Bengie and José became the first brothers to play in a World Series game together since Felipe and Matty Alou did so for the Giants in the 1962 World Series. Bengie reached base safely all five times he batted in Game 3, becoming the only MLB catcher ever to do so in a World Series as the Angels won 10–4. In Game 4, his eighth inning passed ball allowed J. T. Snow to go to second base, where he scored the deciding run on a David Bell single as the Angels went on to lose 4–3. After the Giants took a 1–0 lead in the first inning of Game 7, Molina had an RBI double against Liván Hernández to tie the game in the bottom of the inning. The Angels went on to prevail 4–1 for their first World Series championship. Overall, Molina batted .286 with six hits and two RBI in the series.

On pace for his best season ever offensively in 2003, Molina was a finalist for the All-Star Final Vote, which Jason Varitek ultimately won. Against the Twins on September 4, he was involved in a collision at home plate as Dustan Mohr, a former linebacker, crashed into him, scoring the game's tying run, knocking the baseball from Molina's glove, and injuring the catcher, which allowed Shannon Stewart to score the winning run from second base. Molina fractured two bones in the vicinity of his left wrist, requiring season-ending surgery. In 119 games (409 at bats), Molina batted .281 with 115 hits, 14 home runs, and 71 RBI. Defensively, he had a .993 fielding percentage and threw out an AL-leading 44% of attempted base stealers, winning his second consecutive Gold Glove Award.

==== 2004–2005 ====
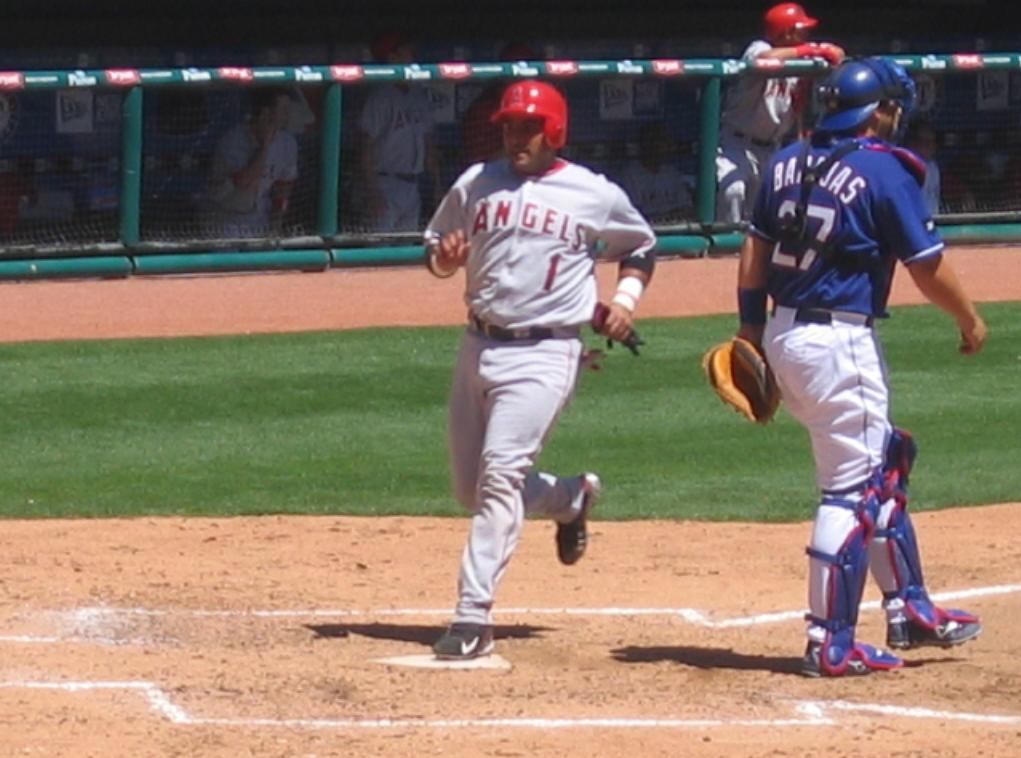
Molina scores a run in 2005 as Rod Barajas stands by.

Though Molina's wrist was healthy by the start of the 2004 season, hamstring issues caused him to miss two weeks of spring training as well as the first seven games of the regular season. Scioscia said that the 230 pounds (100 kg) catcher "battles his weight ... he needs to keep in tune with his body and his weight, because it can impact the length of your career." In his first game back, on April 13, he hit a two-run home run against Joel Piñeiro as the Angels defeated the Seattle Mariners 7–5. He was on the disabled list twice, from June 4 to 19 with a strained left calf and from August 1 to 17 with a fractured right index finger. With speculation that the Angels might choose to promote 2001 first-round draft pick Jeff Mathis in 2005 rather than pick up Molina's $3 million option, Molina refused to speak with reporters until mid-August. In 97 games (337 at bats), he batted .276 with 93 hits, 10 home runs, and 54 RBI. Defensively, he had a .995 fielding percentage but threw out only 26% of attempted base stealers. In the playoffs for the AL West champion Angels, Molina started only two of Anaheim's three games, as José had emerged as Bartolo Colón's personal catcher and caught the pitcher in Game 2. Molina had one hit in six at bats as the Boston Red Sox swept Anaheim in the ALDS. That November, the Angels decided to pick up Molina's $3 million club option for the 2005 season.

Molina was on the disabled list from April 18 to May 12, 2005, with a right quadriceps strain. He had four hits on his 31st birthday, July 20, in a 3–0 loss to the Oakland Athletics. On July 31, he and José both hit home runs against Randy Johnson in an 8–7 loss to the Yankees. In 119 games (410 at bats), he batted a career-high .295 with 121 hits, 15 home runs, and 69 RBI. Only Víctor Martínez had a higher batting average (.305) than Molina among AL catchers. Defensively, Molina had a .996 fielding percentage, though he led the AL with 10 passed balls. He threw out 31% of attempted base stealers.

The Angels won the AL West again. Against the Yankees in the ALDS, Molina homered in each of the first three games. He batted .444 with five RBI in the series as the Angels defeated the Yankees in five games. Against the Chicago White Sox in the ALCS, he batted just .118 as Chicago defeated the Angels in five games.

=== Free agency (2005–2006) ===
Molina's contract with the Angels expired after the 2005 season, and the team decided not pursue him because they were not interested in offering him the long-term contract he sought. The New York Mets made him an offer of a three-year, $18 million contract in November, but when Molina tried to negotiate for more, the Mets traded for Paul Lo Duca and rescinded their offer. Still unsigned in January 2006, Molina threatened to sit out the season if he did not get a contract to his liking. In February, he received offers on one-year contracts from the Los Angeles Dodgers and Toronto Blue Jays. Though the Dodgers offered more money, he chose the Blue Jays' $5 million offer on February 6 because the team had fewer promising catching prospects, making it seem more likely they would offer him a long-term deal in the future. After signing with the Blue Jays, Molina expressed his anger at the Angels over how he parted company with them. "The way they let me go without a notice, without calling me, that said a lot," Molina said. "They never let me know. They just threw me like a piece of trash." However, Molina's agent Alan Nero later clarified that the Angels did indeed inform Molina of their decision.

=== Toronto Blue Jays (2006) ===
Molina got off to a slow start to the 2006 season, throwing out only 13% of baserunners in the season's first two months and getting outhit by backup catcher Gregg Zaun. Ultimately, manager John Gibbons decided to use a platoon system, with Zaun getting several of the starts against right-handed pitchers. Molina was one of Toronto's most consistent hitters in August. Against the Seattle Mariners on the 14th of that month, he caught all 14 innings of a game, ending the contest with a walk-off RBI single against Emiliano Fruto. In 117 games (433 at bats), he batted .284 with 123 hits, 19 home runs, and 57 RBI. He only threw out 18% of base stealers in 2006, a diminished total he blamed on pitchers' failure to hold runners close to the bases.

=== San Francisco Giants (2007–2010) ===
==== 2007 ====
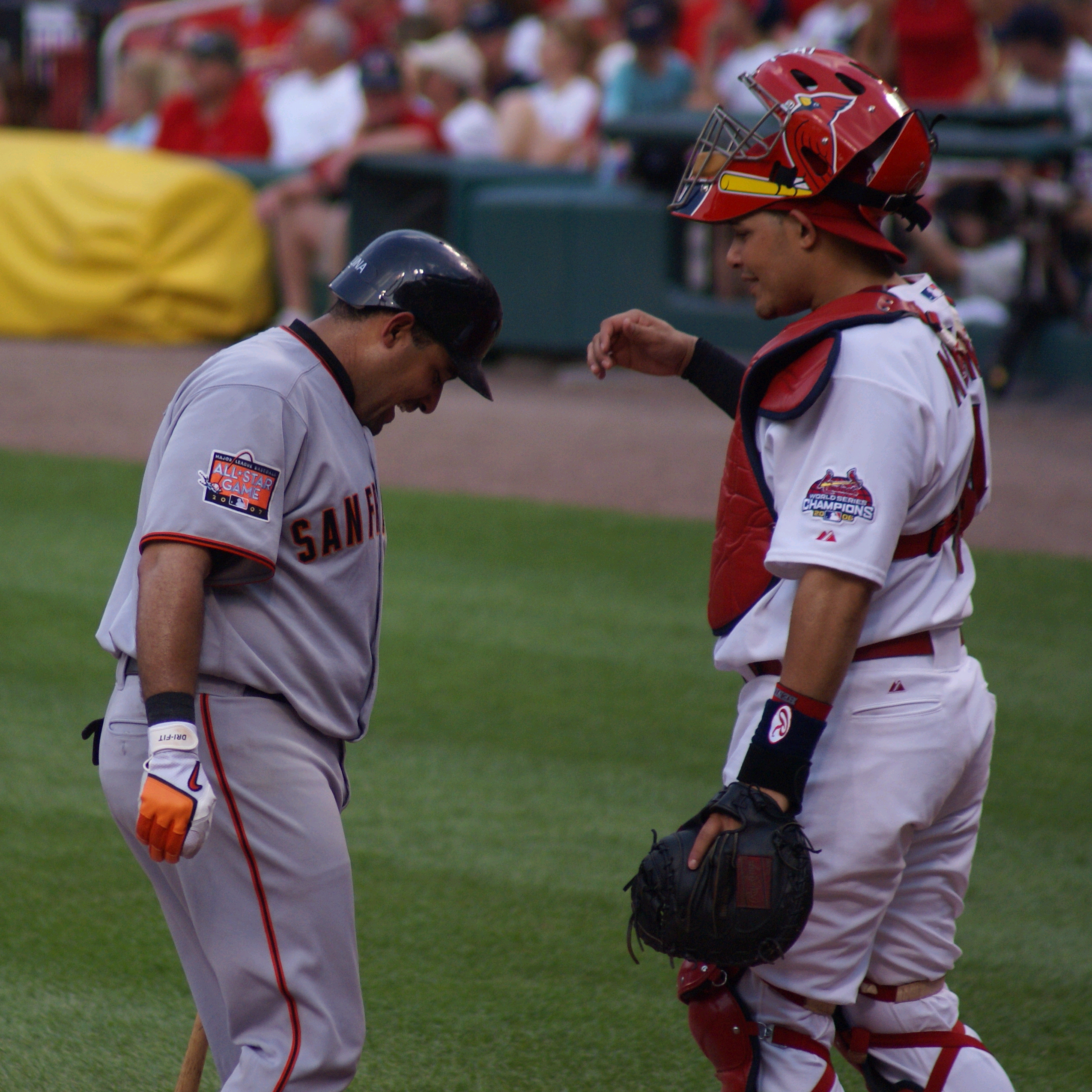
Bengie and Yadier

After the 2006 season, Molina became a free agent and signed a three-year, $16 million deal with the Giants, who needed a replacement at the position as Mike Matheny had to retire due to concussion problems. On May 7, he hit two home runs in the fifth inning of a 9–4 win over the Mets, becoming the first Giant with two home runs in an inning since Willie McCovey in 1977. Molina also had five RBI in the game.

Molina hit his 100th home run on September 5, 2007, off of Jorge Julio in the sixth inning of a 5–3 victory against the Colorado Rockies. In a pregame ceremony on September 21, Molina was announced as the winner of the Willie Mac Award, which recognizes the Giant with the most spirit and leadership. He got the most out of 1,617 fan votes. In the first inning of the game against the Reds, Molina recorded career RBI number 500 in the bottom of the first on a single that scored Dave Roberts. However, the Giants eventually lost 9–8 in 11 innings. In 134 games (497 at bats), Molina batted .276 with 137 hits, 19 home runs, and 81 RBI. He walked only 2.9% of the time, the lowest percentage in the National League (NL). However, his 78 RBI as a catcher were at the time the second most in a season by a San Francisco Giant, trailing only Dick Dietz's 104 in 1970. Defensively, he had a .991 fielding percentage and threw out 30% of base stealers. He led his league in passed balls for the second time, this year with 16.

==== 2008 ====
In 2008 and 2009, Molina served as the Giants' cleanup hitter. On April 8, 2008, Molina hit two home runs, including a walk-off one against Cla Meredith in the 11th inning of a 3–2 win over the San Diego Padres. He had a 10-game hitting streak from May 17 to 28, winning the NL Player of the Week Award for May 19 through 25 after batting .652 with six doubles, a home run, and nine RBI. On June 2, he had his 1,000th hit in a 10–2 victory over the Mets. He batted .333 through June 9, then hit only .200 over his next 34 games through July 26, dropping his batting average to .282. During that stretch, however, he hit two home runs on July 22 in a 6–3 win over the Washington Nationals. He had a game-ending sacrifice fly on August 20 in a 6–5 win over the Florida Marlins.

Molina received the Willie Mac Award for the second year in a row on September 26. During the game that night against the Dodgers, he became the first player in MLB history to hit a home run and not get credit for a run scored. In the sixth inning, he hit a ball off the right field wall at AT&T Park. The umpire said the ball was in fair play, and Molina wound up at first base. Emmanuel Burriss immediately ran out to first base to pinch run for him, as Giants manager Bruce Bochy discussed the matter with the umpires. After examining instant replay, the umpires ruled the hit a home run but refused Bochy the opportunity to reinsert Molina into the game, meaning Burriss was credited with the run. San Francisco continued the game under protest but won 6–5 in the 10th inning. In a career-high 145 games and 530 at bats, Molina batted .292 with 16 home runs and a career-high 95 RBI. He led the major leagues with 11 sacrifice flies. Defensively, he had a .995 fielding percentage and threw out 35% of attempted base stealers.

==== 2009 ====
On April 9, 2009, Molina had four RBI in a 7–1 win over the Milwaukee Brewers. His pinch-hit, 10th-inning double drove in the only run of the game in a victory over the Padres on April 22. After starting his career 0 for 12 against Jason Marquis, he hit two home runs and had four RBI against the pitcher in an 8–3 win over the Rockies. With two strikes on him and two outs in the eighth inning against the Diamondbacks on August 27, Molina hit a three-run home run against Chad Qualls, helping the Giants come from behind to win 4–3. His eighth-inning home run against Todd Coffey snapped a tie and provided the winning margin in a 3–2 victory over the Brewers on September 4. On September 29, he hit two home runs and had four RBI in an 8–4 win over the Diamondbacks. In 132 games (491 at bats), he batted .265 with 130 hits, a career-high 20 home runs, and 80 RBI. Defensively, he had a .995 fielding percentage and threw out 23% of attempted base stealers. He again led the majors with 11 sacrifice flies, though he walked in only 2.5% of his plate appearances, the lowest percentage in the majors.

Following the 2009 season, sportswriter Daniel Brown called Molina "one the greatest offensive catchers in Giants history". Brown cited Molina's .278 average over his three seasons with the Giants, the highest of San Francisco catchers who played 350 or more games. Molina's 256 RBI were the most among Giants catchers in a three-year span.

==== 2010 ====
A free agent after the 2009 season, Molina was not expected to return to the Giants, as he wanted a multi-year contract and the Giants expected prospect Buster Posey to soon take over the role. The Mets were again reported to be interested in him, but that deal fell through. On January 19, 2010, Molina re-signed a one-year, $4.5 million contract with the Giants. He had four hits and four RBI on April 12 in a 6–1 victory over the Pittsburgh Pirates. He batted .344 in April but hit only .212 in the season's following two months. In 61 games (202 at bats) for the Giants, Molina batted .257 with three home runs and seventeen RBI.

=== Texas Rangers (2010) ===
Following a losing streak by the Giants, and with the emergence of Posey, who had been hitting well while playing first base since a callup towards the end of May, the Giants traded Molina to the Rangers on June 30 for relief pitcher Chris Ray and a player to be named later, eventually determined as minor league pitcher Michael Main. The deal was made official the next day. With the Rangers, Molina replaced Matt Treanor as the starting catcher, though he and Treanor split playing time beginning in late August. On July 16, Molina hit for the cycle in an 8–4 victory over Boston. He had (in order) a single, a double, a grand slam home run, and a triple, leaving the game with a minor leg injury after the triple. Teammate Michael Young was surprised that Molina accomplished the feat at Fenway Park, thinking the stadium's small dimensions would not allow the ball to get far enough away from the outfielders for the slow-running Molina to make it to third base for the required triple. In 57 games (175 at bats) for the Rangers, he batted .240 with 42 hits, two home runs, and 19 RBI. His combined totals between the two ballclubs were 118 games (377 at bats), 94 hits, five home runs, and 36 RBI. Defensively, he had a .993 fielding percentage and again threw out 23% of attempted base stealers.

The Rangers reached the playoffs as AL West champions. In Game 1 of the ALDS, Molina had three hits, a home run, and two RBI in a 5–1 victory over the Tampa Bay Rays. He stole a base for the first time since 2006 in Game 5 as the Rangers again defeated Tampa Bay 5–1, eliminating the Rays. In Game 4 of the ALCS, with two outs in the sixth inning and the Rangers trailing the Yankees 3–2, Molina hit a three-run home run against A. J. Burnett as the Rangers went on to win 10–3. The Rangers won the ALCS in six games, reaching the World Series for the first time in franchise history.

Since the Giants also made it to the World Series, Molina became the sixth player to play for both World Series teams in the same season, which guaranteed him a World Series ring regardless of who won. He batted .182 with one RBI as the Rangers lost the series in five games. After the season was over, Molina became a free agent. Unsigned in 2011, Molina eventually announced his retirement on February 27, 2012.

== Legacy ==
Pitchers had great respect for Molina. "I haven't seen all the catchers in baseball, but I think we're very spoiled. … [He] takes a lot of pride in studying … knowing everyone's game and going in with a solid game plan. There's not a lot of whole lot of shaking off [signs] when we're working together," said Angels starting pitcher Jarrod Washburn. "I can't tell you much about the National League, but in the American League no one stands above him. He can catch and throw with anyone, he can block pitches, and he can get a big hit for you any day of the week...To have that stability behind the plate is nice," said Angels closer Troy Percival. "He helped me mature and succeed. I've said time and time again that he deserves half of those awards that I've gotten," said Tim Lincecum, who won the NL Cy Young Award with Molina catching him in 2008 and 2009. "The things he's done for me – for calling a game, to give me confidence throwing different pitches in different counts – really, really, really benefited me," remembered Giants starter Matt Cain.

During his career, Molina was known for his lack of speed. In a 2006 Sports Illustrated poll of 415 players, 56 percent picked Molina as baseball's slowest runner. A panel of three scouts and an analyst put together by Baseball America that same year named him the second-slowest baserunner, behind Frank Thomas. John Vorperian of the Society for American Baseball Research wrote that he is "[c]onsidered one of the slowest baserunners in his era." His three stolen bases in his career are the second-fewest of any player with at least 5,000 plate appearances, behind only Cecil Fielder's two.

A statue of Molina jumping into Neftali Feliz's arms, after striking out Alex Rodriguez for the final out of the 2010 American League Championship Series, was unveiled on August 7, 2018, at the North Plaza of the Texas Live! entertainment district of the future Globe Life Field.

== Coaching and broadcasting career ==
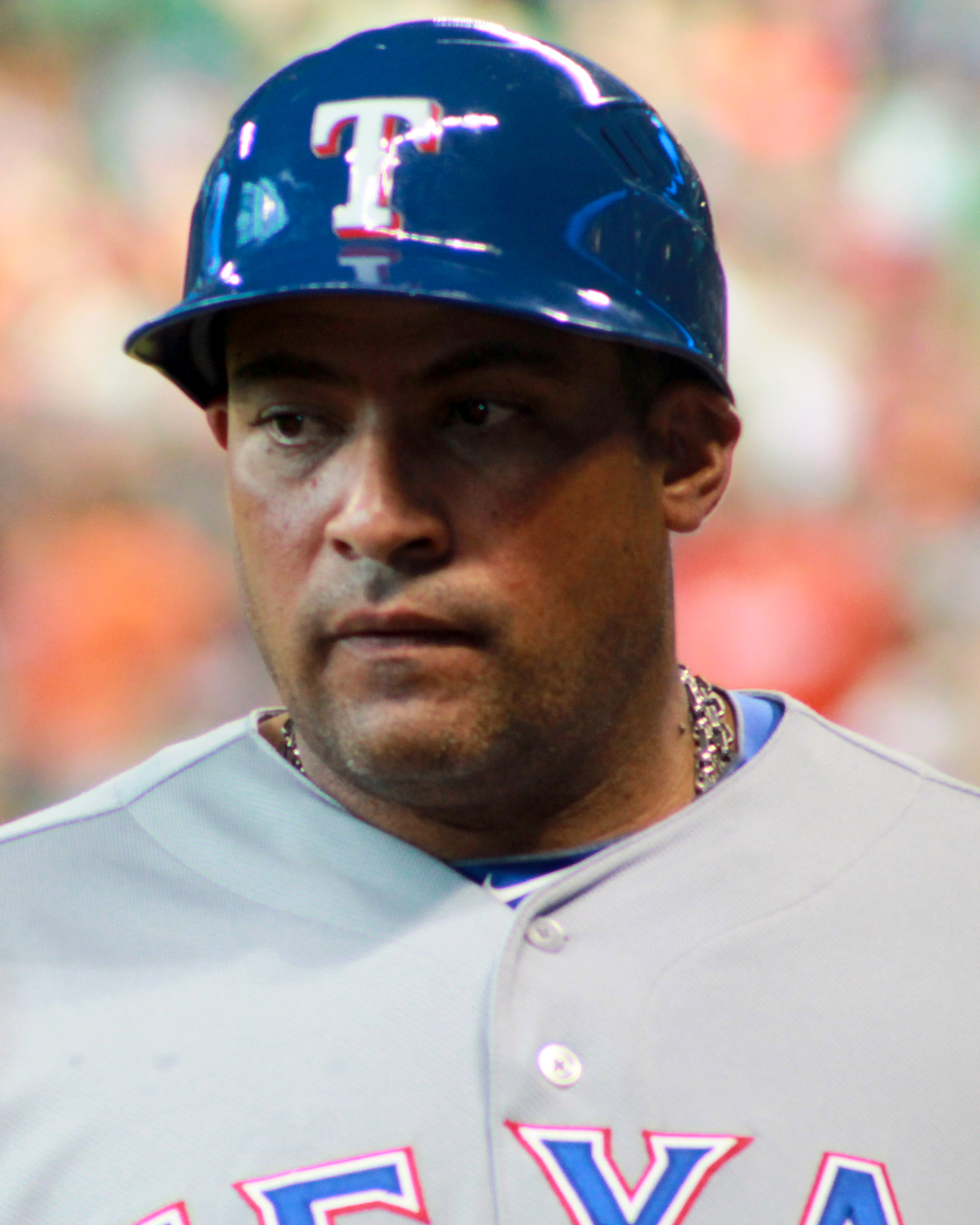
Molina as a Rangers coach (2014)

On December 14, 2012, Molina was hired to be the St. Louis Cardinals' assistant hitting coach, helping out John Mabry in 2013. He joined the Rangers' coaching staff for the 2014 season as their first base coach and catching instructor. Molina was replaced by Héctor Ortiz for the 2015 season when Jeff Banister became the Rangers' new manager. In 2016, he and Polo Ascencio became the Cardinals' first Spanish-language broadcasters in 2016. Molina serves as the color analyst, while Ascencio calls the plays.

== Personal life ==
While at Arizona Western, Molina began dating fellow freshman Josefa, a native of San Luis, Baja California, Mexico. The couple became engaged in September of 1992 and were married that December. They have two children, Kyshly (born in 1994) and Kelssy (born in 1998). Molina is good friends with Ramón Castro, whom his father coached in Little League Baseball.

== See also ==
- List of Major League Baseball career putouts as a catcher leaders
- List of Major League Baseball players from Puerto Rico
- List of Major League Baseball players to hit for the cycle
- List of Puerto Ricans
- List of St. Louis Cardinals coaches

== Notes ==
Achievements
Preceded by Jody Gerut	Hitting for the cycle July 16, 2010	Succeeded by Kelly Johnson
Sporting positions
Preceded by John Mabry	St. Louis Cardinals assistant hitting coach 2013	Succeeded by David Bell
Preceded by Dave Anderson	Texas Rangers first base coach 2014	Succeeded by Héctor Ortiz
