= El Refugio, Baja California =

El Refugio
- Location in Mexico
- Coordinates: 32°27′19″N 116°49′58″W
- Country: Mexico
- State: Baja California
- Municipality: Tijuana

Population (2010)
  - Total: 36,400

El Refugio ("The Refuge") is a Fraccionamiento in the Tijuana municipality of Baja California, Mexico. The city had a population of 36,400 as of 2010.
