= Maclovio Rojas =

- Location within Mexico
- Coordinates: 32°28′23″N 116°48′10″W
- Country: Mexico
- State: Baja California
- Municipality: Tijuana
- Elevation: 187 m (614 ft)

Population (2014)
  - Total: 7,279

Maclovio Rojas is a neighborhood within the City of Tijuana, Baja California, Mexico.
