= La Presa Este, Tijuana =

La Presa Este
- Borough of Tijuana
- Delegación Municipal La Presa Este; Municipal Borough La Presa Este
- Location within Tijuana
- Coordinates: 32.458313°N 116.821004°W
- State: Baja California
- Municipality: Tijuana
- Borough: Delegación La Presa Este

Government
  - Type: Delegación
  - Municipal Delegate: María Cristina Muñoz Sánchez

Population (2015)
  - Total: 215,115
- Postal code: 22500
- Website: (in Spanish)

La Presa Este (Spanish for "Eastern Water Dam") is the second-most largest borough of Tijuana Municipality, Baja California first being the unincorporated part of the municipality, stretching from the United States border in the north to Rosarito Beach Municipality in the south.

== History ==
in 1835 a large amount of the Rancho Cueros de Venado owned by Juan María Marrón was placed in this Area of Tijuana.
