= San Antonio de los Buenos =

- Borough (Delegación) of Tijuana
- Delegación San Antonio de los Buenos
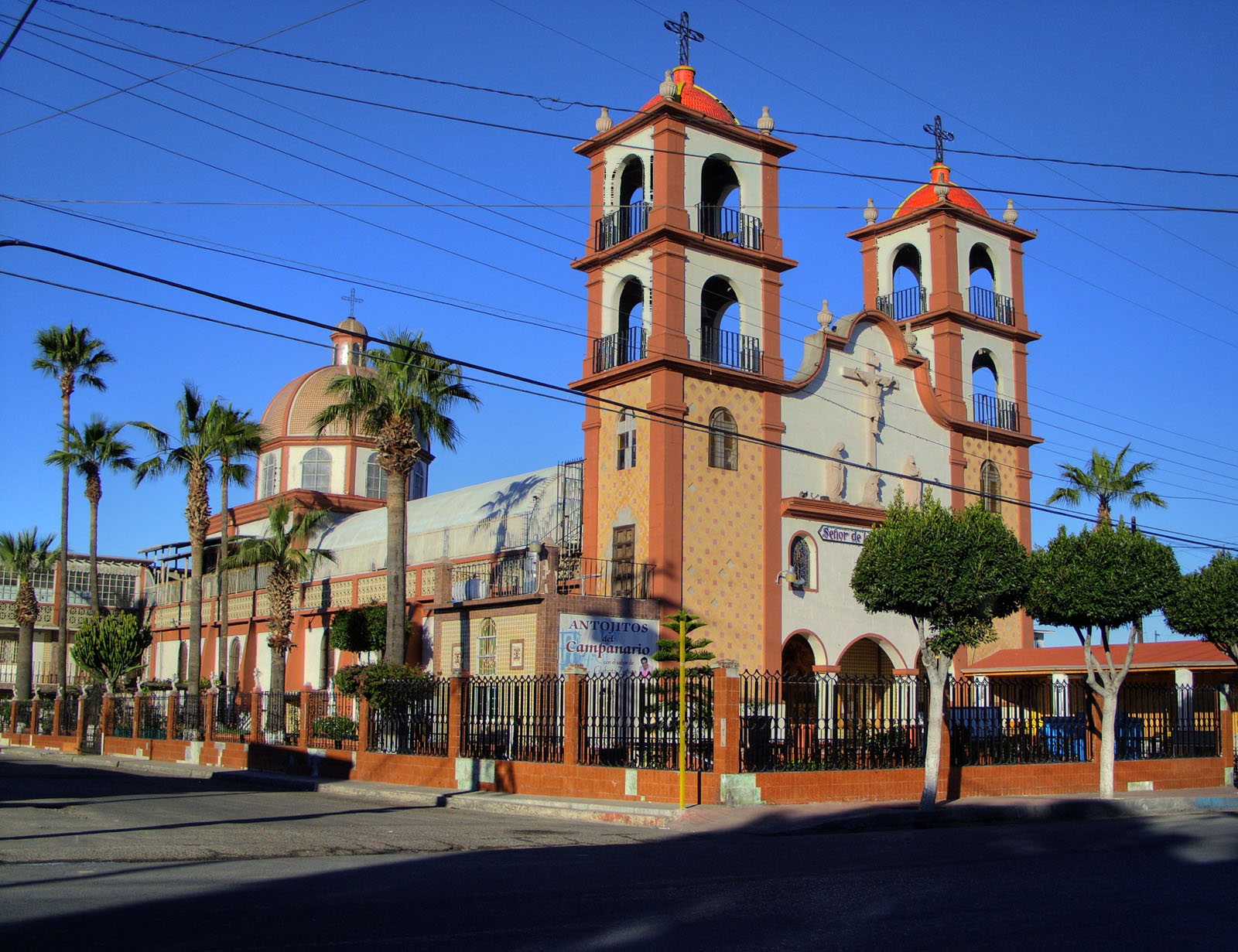

- Location in Tijuana
- Coordinates: 32.4804°N 117.032089°W
- Country: Mexico
- State: Baja California
- Municipality (municipio): Tijuana
- Area code: 664

San Antonio de los Buenos is a borough of the municipality of Tijuana in Baja California, Mexico.

San Antonio de los Buenos borough lies southwest of the city center and Sánchez Taboada boroughs and east of Playas de Tijuana. Blvd. de los Fundadores and Periférico are major thoroughfares. Monte San Antonio lies in this borough and is the highest part of Tijuana. There are several broadcasting antennae at the peak due to its height.
