= Quinta del Cedro =

- Location within Mexico
- Coordinates: 32°15′41″N 117°2′8″W
- Country: Mexico
- State: Baja California
- Municipality: Tijuana
- Elevation: 200 m (660 ft)

Population (2014)
  - Total: 5,704

Quinta del Cedro is a city in Baja California, located in Tijuana Municipality. The city had a population of 5,704 as of 2010.
