= Península Tijuana =

Building complex in Tijuana, Mexico

Coordinates: 32.513004°N 116.9666349°W

Península
- Location: Tijuana, Baja California mexico
- Opened: 20 September 2022
- Developer: Grupo DLG
- Num. of stores: 101
- Num. of anchor tenants: 3
- Floors: 3 (5 In Liverpool)
- Parking: 2 Floors of underground Parking
- Website: https://www.peninsulatijuana.com/

Península is a mixed-use complex in Tijuana set which opened on September 20, 2022 along the Vía Rápida Oriente, the city's main east–west corridor, in the Colonia Chapultepec Alamar neighborhood of La Mesa borough. The lot area is 6.3 hectares (680,000 sq ft), with a gross leasable area of 275,000 square metres (2,960,000 sq ft). There are 3,400 parking spaces.

The shopping center component has a gross leasable area of 80,000 square metres (860,000 sq ft), with 30% of the space dedicated to food and beverage and entertainment. Anchors include a 21,000 m^{2} (230,000 sq ft) Liverpool department store, a Suburbia department store, Cinemex multicinemas, Calimax supermarket, and Family Fitness, while larger mall stores include Innovasport, Zara, C&A and H&M. The restaurant zone includes a food hall as well as 4,000 sq.m. of patio space. T

== Anchor tenants ==
Tennant	type	opened
Liverpool	Department Store	2022
Suburbia	Department Store	2023
Calimax	Supermarket	2023
