= Las Delicias, Baja California =

Suburb of Tijuana in Mexico

Coordinates: 32°24′32″N 116°56′37″W

Las Delicias is a suburb in the city of Tijuana in the Mexican state of Baja California. The suburb had a population of 15,486 as of 2010.

Las Delicias observes Daylight Saving Time (DST) with time zone PDT (GMT -07:00)
