= Pórticos de San Antonio =

Coordinates: 32°26′33″N 117°02′03″W

Pórticos de San Antonio, or San Antonio Heights, is a fraccionamiento in Baja California in Tijuana Municipality. The city had a population of 34,234 as of 2010.
