= Terrazas del Valle =

City in Baja California, Mexico

Coordinates: 32°29′15″N 116°49′36″W

Terrazas del Valle – Terraces of the Valley – is a city in Baja California in Tijuana Municipality. The city had a population of 20,421 as of 2010.

Terrezas del Valle is located in the far east of the municipality, southeast of Tijuana and the last major city on the federal highway to Tecate.

This town was founded in 1972 by Salvador Fuentes Ducoing

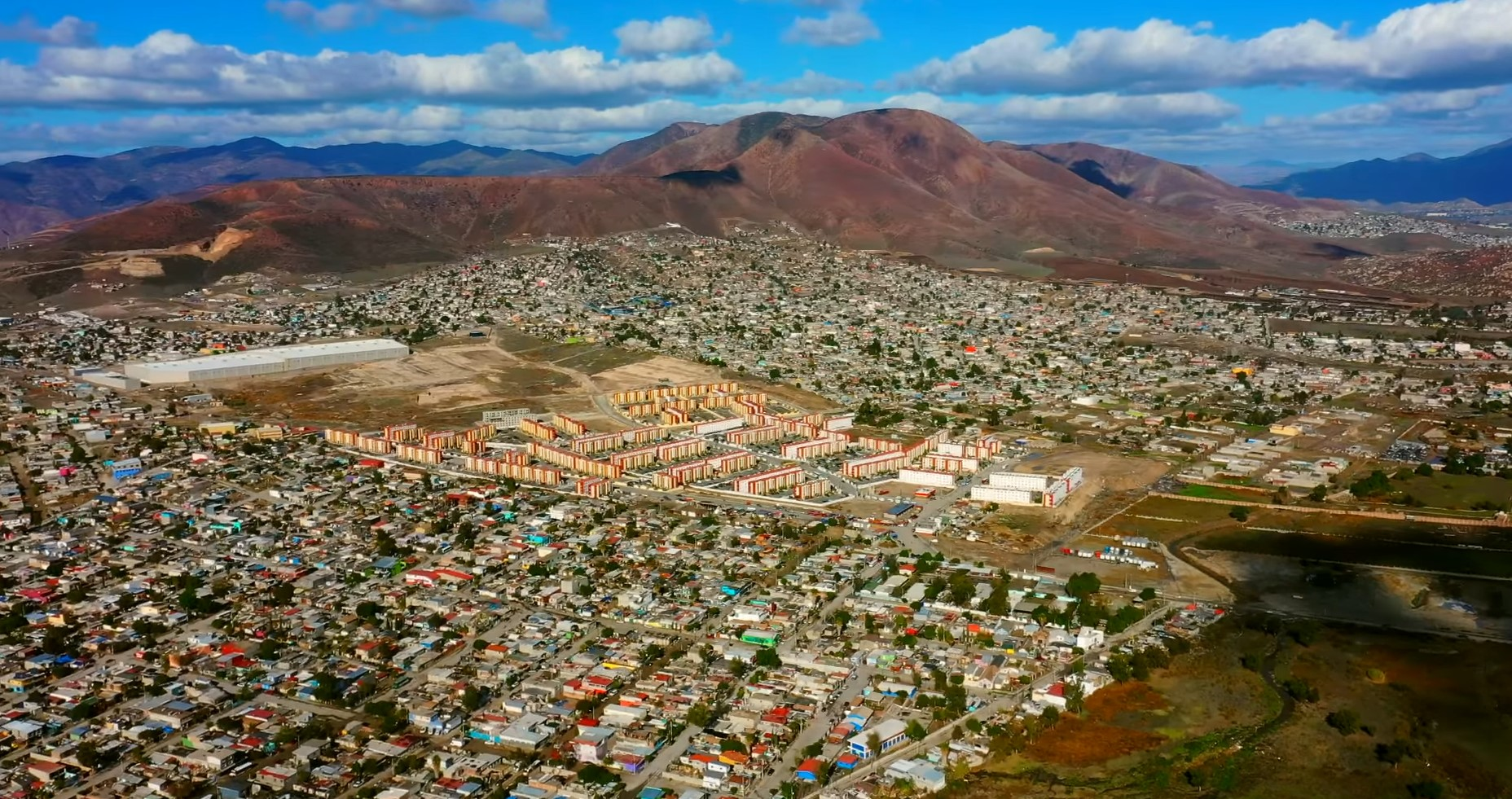
