= Playas de Tijuana =

- Borough of Tijuana
- Delegación Municipal Playas de Tijuana; Municipal Borough Playas de Tijuana
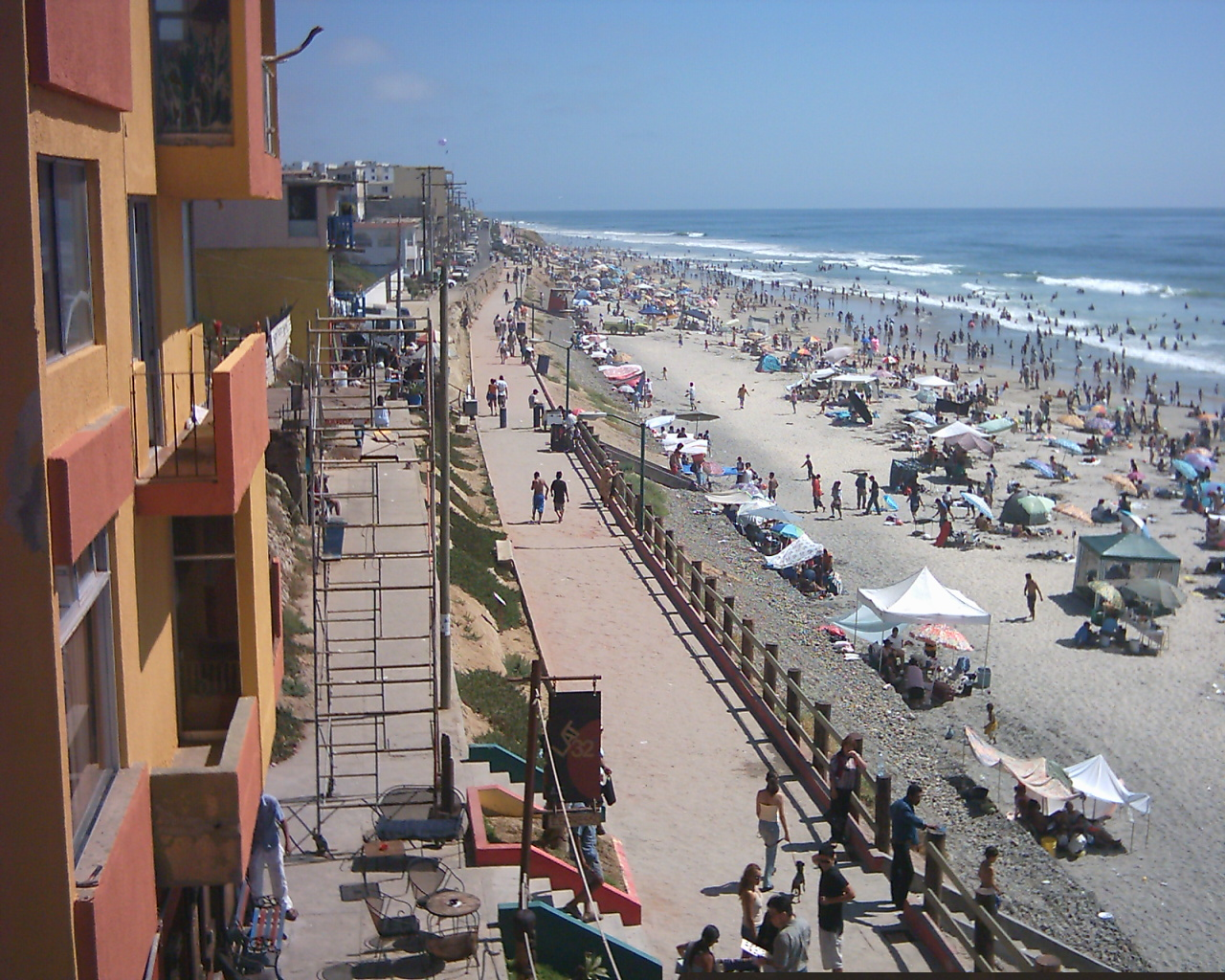
- View of the beaches
- Nickname: Playas OT beach
- Location within Tijuana
- Coordinates: 32.522717°N 117.112428°W
- State: Baja California
- Municipality: Tijuana
- Borough: Delegación Playas de Tijuana

Government
  - Type: Delegación
  - Municipal Delegate: Manuel González Reyes
  - Secretary General: José Esteban Hernández Cuevas

Population (2015)
  - Borough of Tijuana: 146,021
  - Urban: 160,301
  - Metro: 159,866
- Postal code: 22500
- Website: (in Spanish) Playas de Tijuana

Playas de Tijuana (Spanish for "beaches of Tijuana") is the westernmost borough of the municipality of Tijuana, Baja California, stretching from the United States border in the north to Rosarito Beach Municipality in the south. The Bullring by the Sea was opened in 1960.

== History ==
The current border between Baja California in Mexico and California in the United States was delineated in 1848. A marble monument was erected on the border near the shoreline in 1851.

The borough began to be developed in 1957 with the fraccionamientos of Soler and Costa Azul. The name "Playas de Tijuana" was acquired in 1959. The Bullring by the Sea was opened in 1960. Development continued through the 1980s.

== Geography ==
The borough of Playas de Tijuana is located in the city of Tijuana, bordered by the Pacific Ocean to the west, the United States (California) to the north, the municipality of Playas de Rosarito to the south and the boroughs Centro to the Northeast and San Antonio de los Buenos to the East.

Playas de Tijuana borders the United States cities of Imperial Beach and San Diego, but there is no border crossing in the borough. In contrast to Playas de Tijuana, the Tijuana River Valley immediately north of the border remains rural and agricultural in character.

== Administration ==
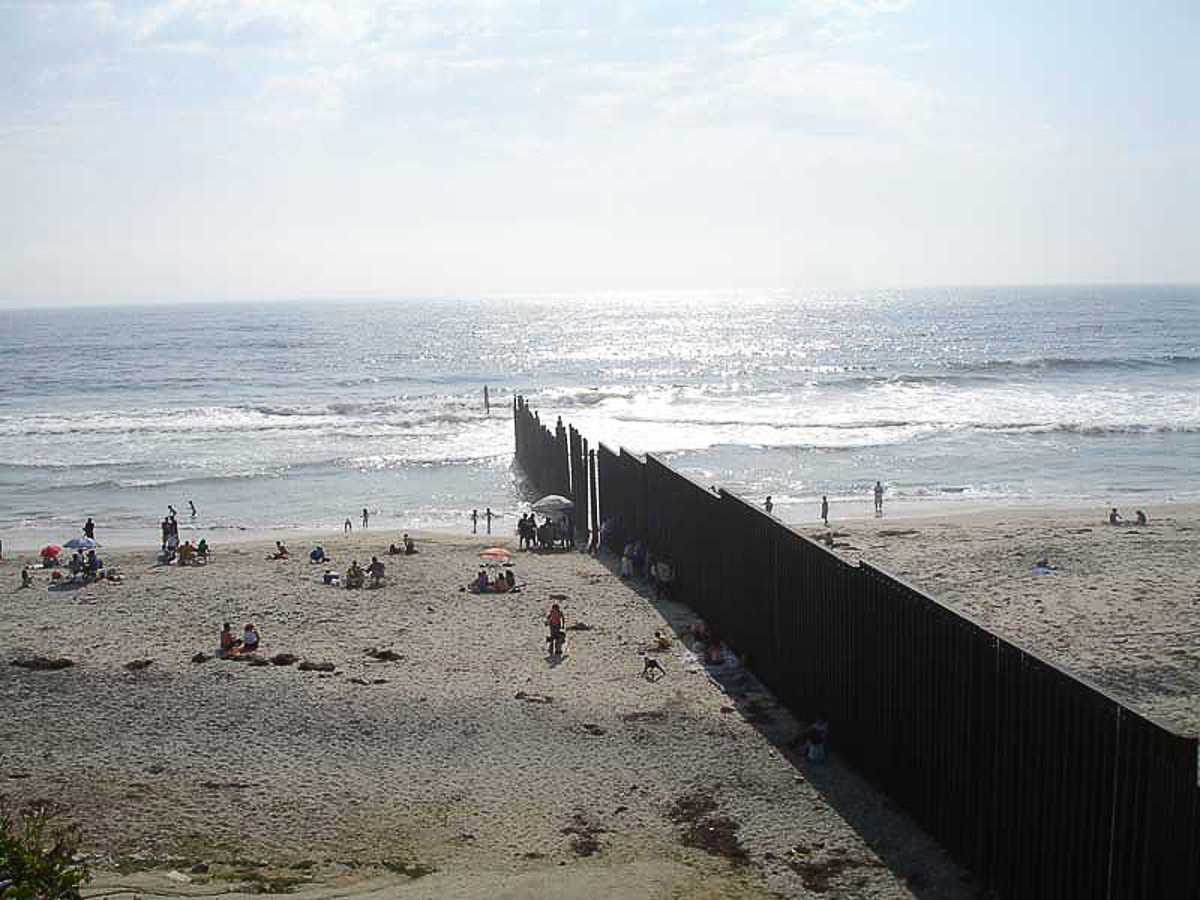
View of the U.S.-Mexico border fence from Playas de Tijuana, at the left. Before fortification

Its administration or government relies on a Municipal Delegate, or Delegado Municipal (in Spanish), who is appointed by the Municipal President of Tijuana.

=== Borough Service Departments ===
The borough is in charge of the following services:

- Urban Planning:
  - Construction permissions
  - Land usage authorization & certification
- Civil Registry:
  - Marriage certifications
  - Defunction certificates
  - Birth certificates
- Inspection and Verification:
  - Request of various certificates
  - Citizen reports
- Public Works:
  - Maintenance of street lights
  - Street paving
  - Street maintenance
- Community Development:
  - Housing support (incentives for house acquisition)
  - Scholarships (various types)

== Entertainment and culture ==
The Paseo Ensenada is a popular place for meeting and passing free time, and where major commercial centres and businesses are located. Plaza Coronado, which is located at the beginning of Paseo Ensenada, is the major entertainment centre, where mainly young people gather every day to spend free time. Water sports such as surfing, bodyboarding, and kayaking are available when ocean water quality is good—the water quality can be very bad soon after it rains. The Monumental bullring is located here as well as the Tijuana campus of the Universidad Iberoamericana.

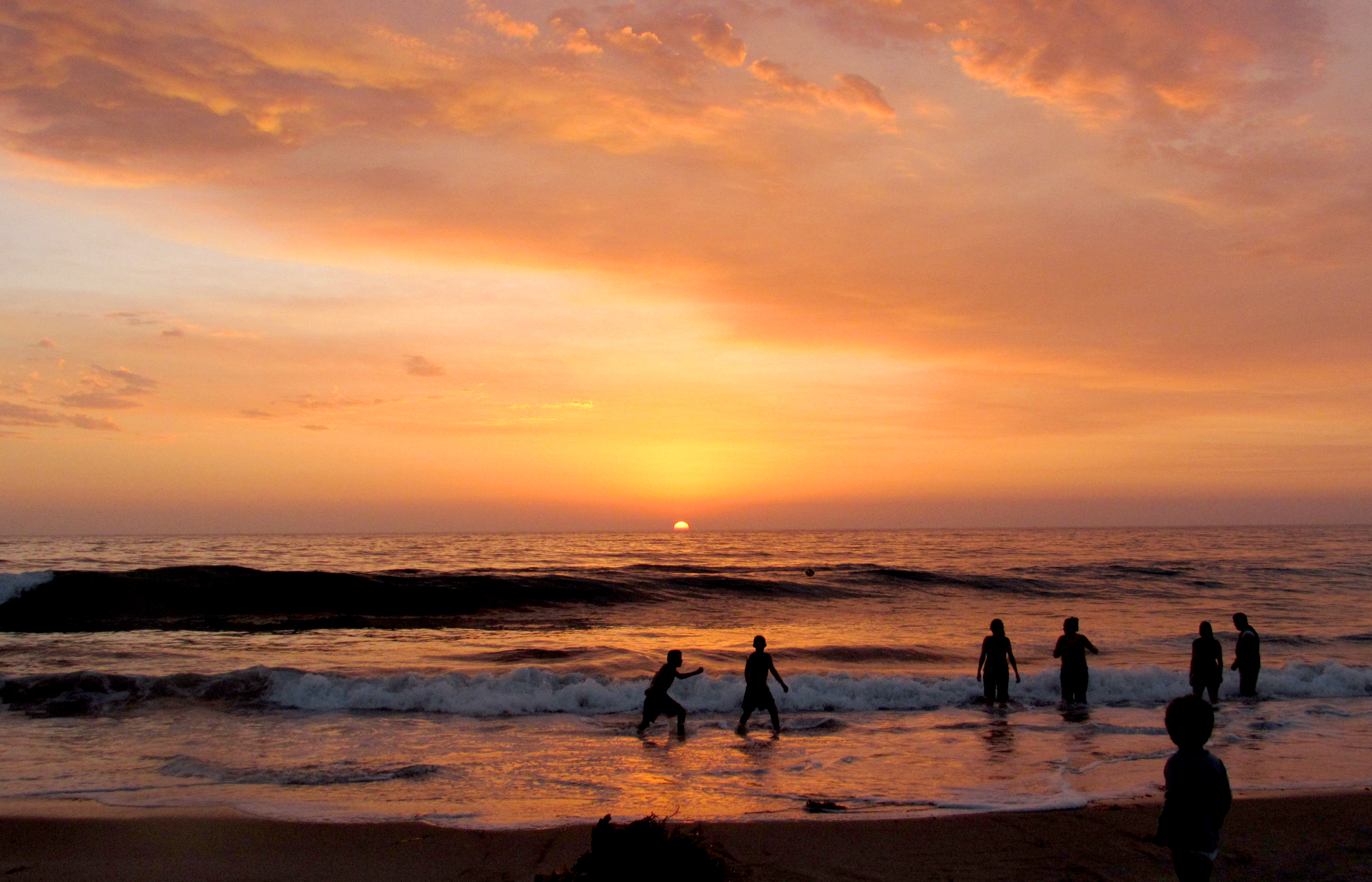
Kids playing at sunset in Playas de Tijuana

Playas de Tijuana has its own Arts & Culture House, which has many local and artistic endeavors, such as a ballet school, a drawing school, painting school, dancing school, and many others. The Arts & Culture House is located inside the complex where the local government building is, and also inside the complex there is another smaller bullfight ring, known as the Cortijo San José, which sometimes hosts rodeo shows. Along with the administration buildings, the House, and the Cortijo, there is a civic square where every September 15 is held the independence celebration. Playas de Tijuana is home to several NGO's that are leaders in local issues like sustainable development, clean water quality in local beaches and public policy like open space and parkland protection and against a number of housing developments that prevent free access to local beaches and urban sprawl and violence. Federal Highway 1-D starts just south of this borough towards Rosarito and Ensenada.

== Cityscape ==
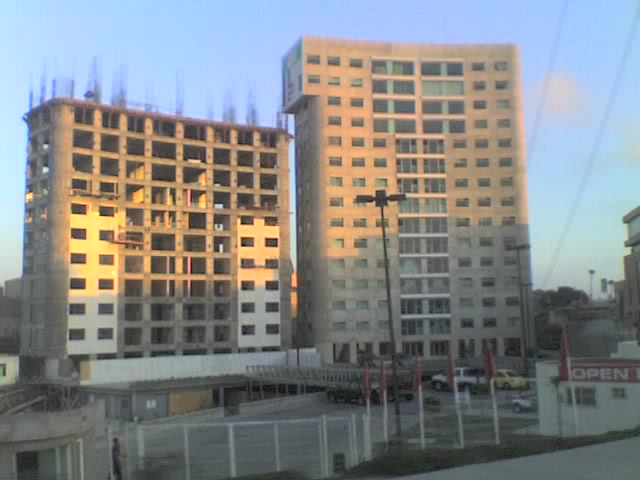
Park Towers Tower I and Tower II under construction

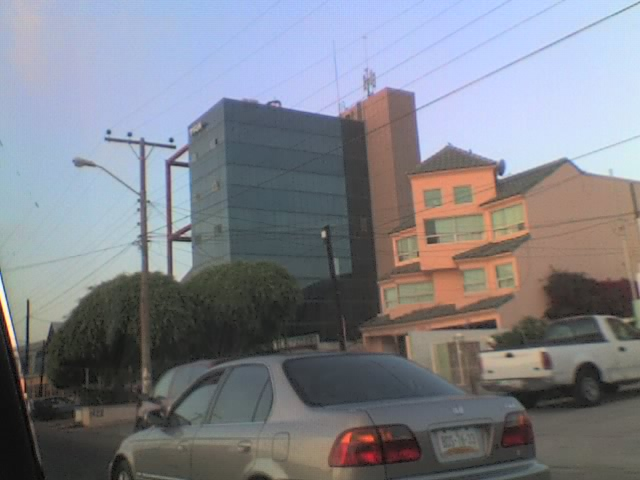
TRW building in Playas

Playas de Tijuana has a good offering of hotels, residences, and places to live, either temporarily or permanently. Such places include the following:

- Park Towers
- Oceano21 - A 9-story ocean front mid-rise.
- Real del Mar residential development
  - Marriott Residence Inn Real del Mar
- Playas Diamante residential
- La Perla Tijuana
  - La Perla Pacífico
  - La Perla Bahía
- La Cúspide Residencial
- Puesta del Sol residential,
- AQUA Residential Towers
- Dali Suites

Playas has been recently experiencing mid/high-rise building growth despite opposition from environmental organizations and local laws. One project is the 17-story high Park Towers complex, with four towers projected. Many other low-rise buildings, ranging from 5+ story are found throughout Playas. However, the economic downturn beginning in 2008 has caused many half-finished projects to be abandoned.

== Transportation ==
Playas, as it is the westernmost and thus the last portion in Tijuana, is linked to the rest of the city by two Azul y Blanco bus routes:

- Playas 1-Soler-Centro-Correo-Plaza Río-Palacio-Postal (runs along one of Playas's main avenues, Paseo Ensenada)
- Playas 2-Soler-Centro-Línea-Palacio-Hospital-Buena Vista-Central Camionera (runs along one of Playas's main avenues, Paseo Pedregal)

Playas is also linked to the rest of the city served by three fixed-route taxi lines:

- Playas 1 (similar to Azul y Blanco bus route 1)
- Playas 2 (similar to Azul y Blanco bus route 2)
- Playas 3 (reduced frequencies)
