= La Joya, Baja California =

City in Baja California, Mexico

Coordinates: 32°26′44″N 117°00′11″W

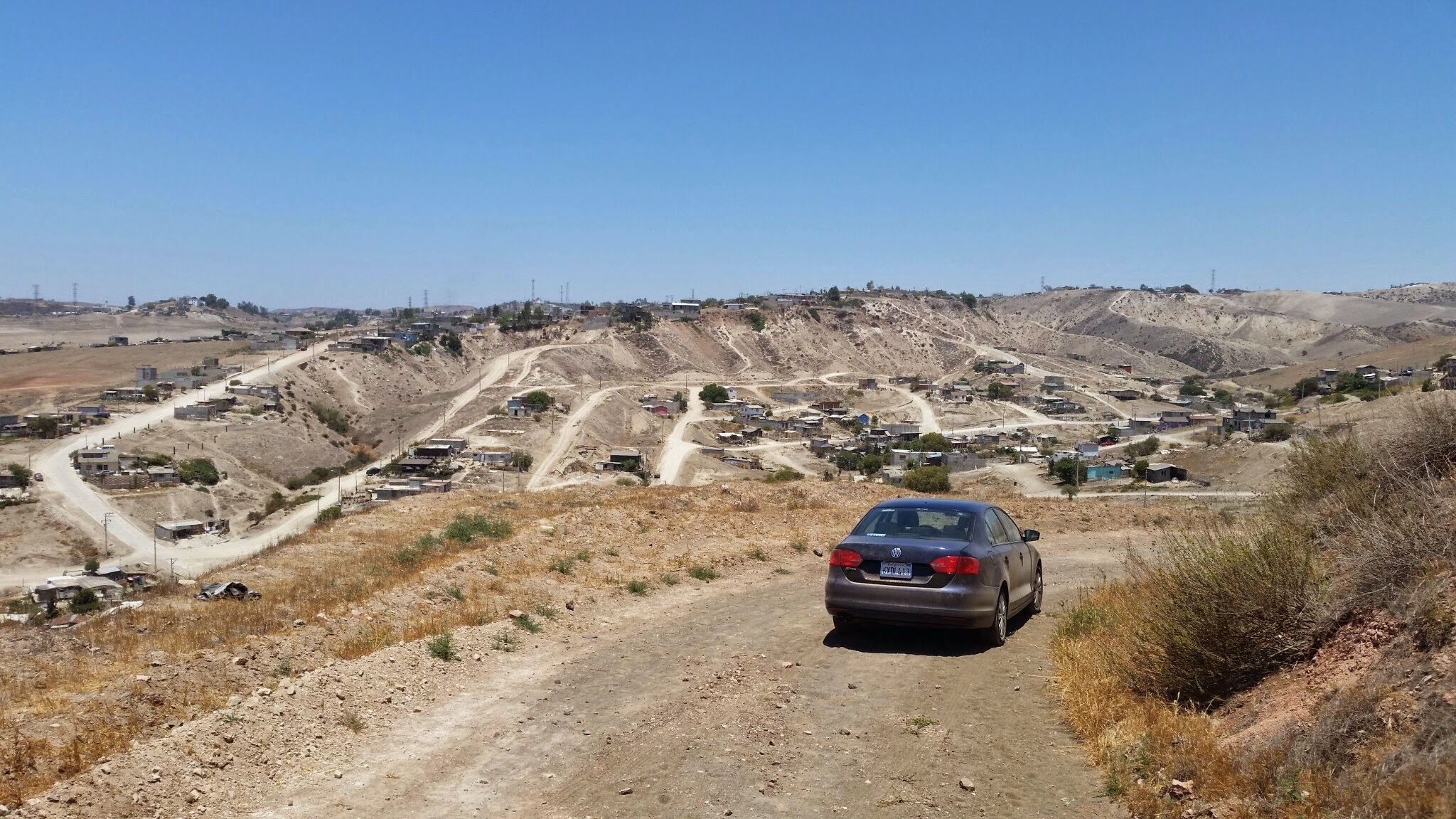
A valley in the La Joya area of Baja, Mexico

La Joya is a city in Baja California also known as "La Gloria" in the Tijuana Municipality. The city had a population of 30,063 as of 2018. Its urban area links Tijuana with Rosarito Beach.

== See also ==
La Jolla, San Diego
