= Villa del Prado, Baja California =

Coordinates: 32°24′30″N 116°57′58″W

Villa del Prado (Spanish for Town of the Meadow) is a city in Baja California in Tijuana Municipality. The city had a population of 12,303 as of 2010.
