= El Niño, Baja California =

El Niño
- City
- Location in Mexico
- Coordinates: 32°20′27″N 116°47′31″W
- Country: Mexico
- State: Baja California
- Municipality: Tijuana
- Elevation: 229 m (751 ft)

Population (2010)
  - Total: 8,999

El Niño is a city in Baja California in Tijuana Municipality. The city had a population of 8,999 as of 2010.
