= Morelos Park =

Ecological reserve in Tijuana, Mexico

Coordinates: 32.499°N 116.940°W

Morelos Park is an ecological reserve in Tijuana, Mexico. It has a zoo, and an artificial lake with different species of fish and ducks. It also has 11 kiosks and 10 green areas for family parties and a barbecue area, which are free to use. It has a small train for children and adults, with its route circling all the way around the lake. There is a dock with small boats in which visitors can take a walk by the lake. two playgrounds, and also houses Baja Paintball, a paintball business which rents paintball equipment and markers and allows people to use its game zones, pedestrian walkways, and bicycles. The playgrounds contain some mechanical rides, along with some normal playground equipment, such as swingsets and slides.

Morelos Park was inaugurated on January 27, 1987, during the administration of Governor Xicoténcatl Leyva Mortera, passing to the municipal administration in 1998, when the decentralized organization called Municipal System of Thematic Parks of Tijuana (SIMPATT) was created.
