= Cerro Colorado (borough) =

- Borough (Delegación) of Tijuana
- Delegación Cerro Colorado
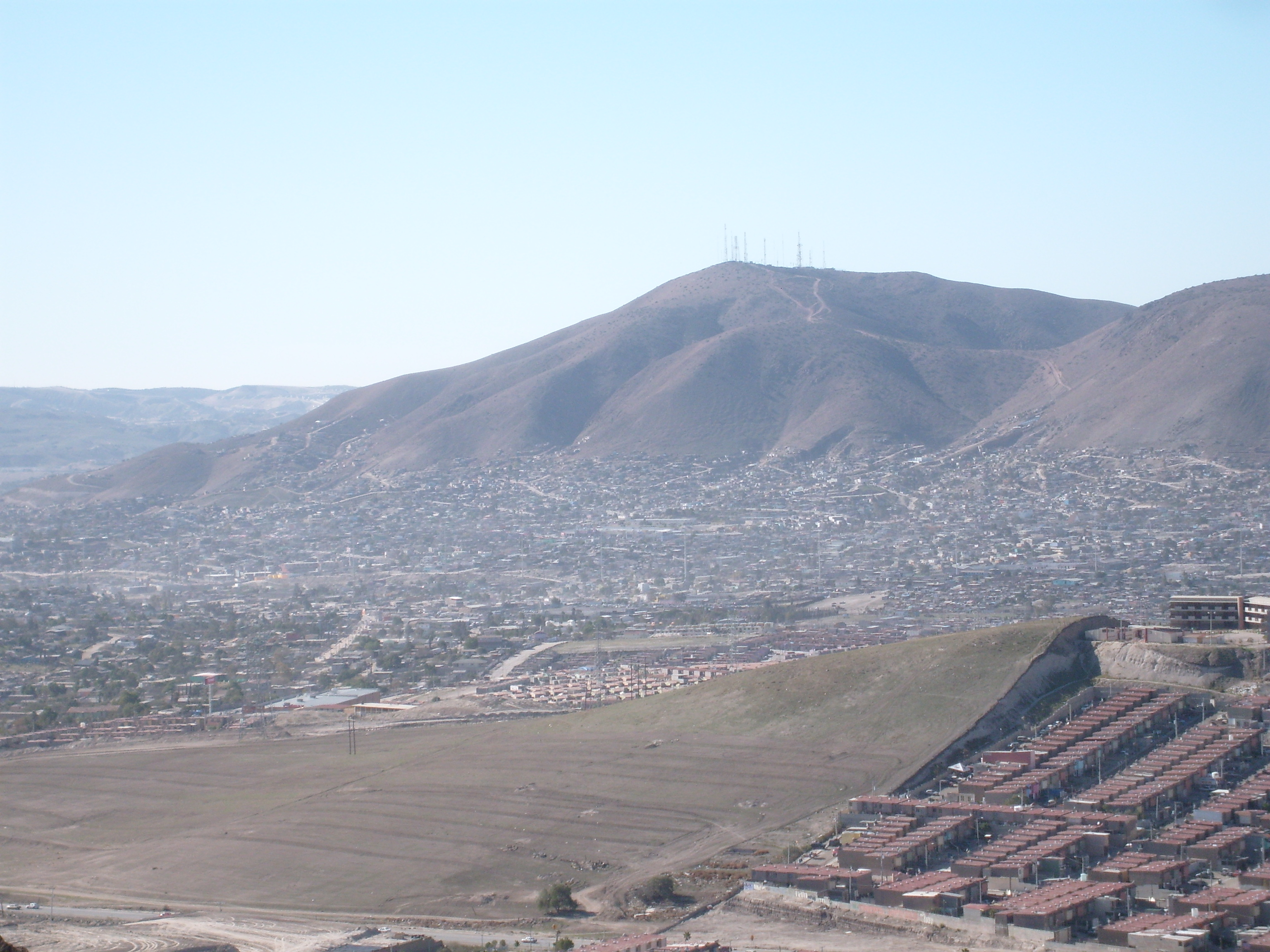
- Part of Cerro Colorado

- Location within Central Tijuana
- Coordinates: 32.49847°N 116.919444°W
- Country: Mexico
- State: Baja California
- Municipality (municipio): Tijuana
- Area code: 664

Cerro Colorado is a borough of the municipality of Tijuana in Baja California, Mexico. The borough is located to the north of and along the west edge of the Cerro Colorado ("Red Hill"). Because of its height, many of the area's antennae, for radio and television stations are located at its peak. It is home to the Toros de Tijuana (Tijuana Bulls) in Estadio Gasmart, located in Colonia Capistrano/Col. Cerro, Colorado. The borough stretches as far north as to include the north side of Calzada Guaycura, and stretches west to Ave. Insurgentes and Phase III of the Zona Río. Major commercial nodes include Plaza Monarca.
