= San Luis, Baja California =

San Luis
- City
- Location in Mexico
- Coordinates: 32°25′54″N 116°57′13″W
- Country: Mexico
- State: Baja California
- Municipality: Tijuana
- Elevation: 188 m (617 ft)

Population (2010)
  - Total: 8,571

San Luis is a city in Baja California in Tijuana Municipality. The city had a population of 8,571 as of 2010.
