= La Mesa (Tijuana) =

- Borough (Delegación) of Tijuana
- Delegación La Mesa
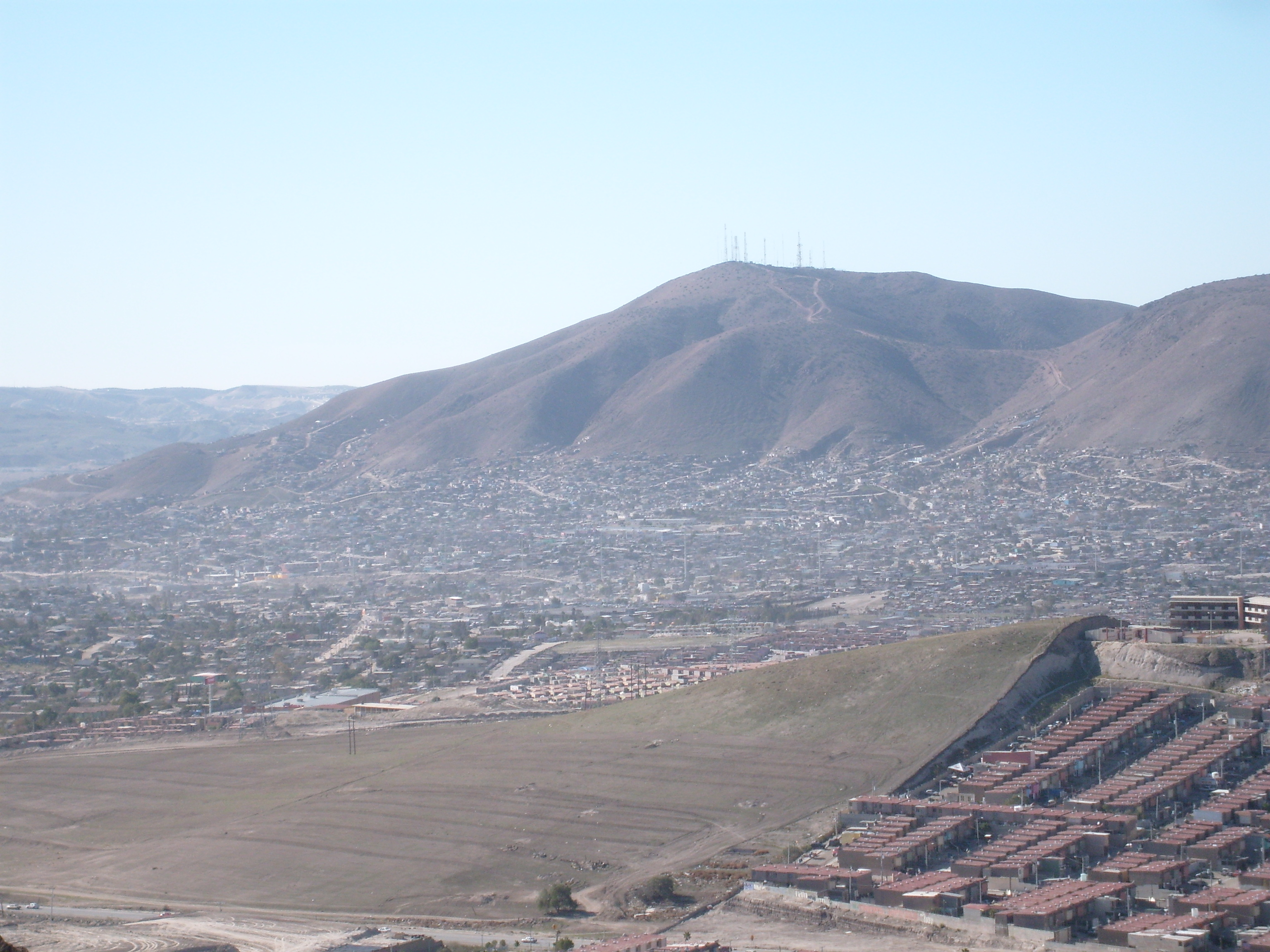
- Part of Cerro Colorado

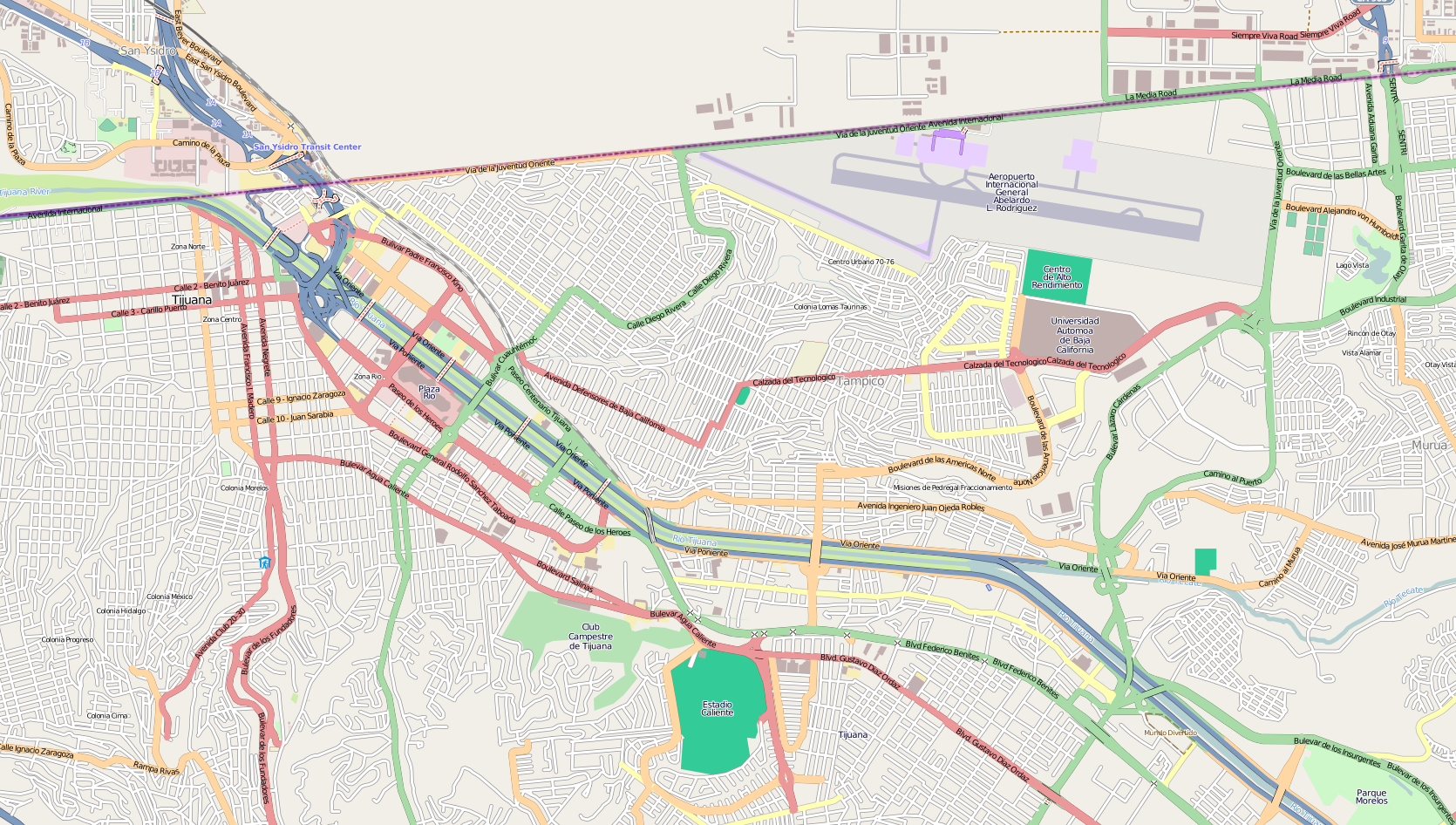
- Location within Central Tijuana
- Coordinates: 32.502704°N 116.966845°W
- Country: Mexico
- State: Baja California
- Municipality (municipio): Tijuana

Population
  - Total: 159,778
- Area code: 664

La Mesa is a borough of the municipality of Tijuana in Baja California, Mexico.

This is where Morelos Park, the largest public park in the city, is located, as well as the Plaza Mundo Divertido, the Macroplaza shopping center, and the Centro de Enseñanza Técnica y Superior (CETYS) university.

The public transportation hub and mass-market retail district Cinco y Diez, and the new (2022) Península mall and mixed-use complex, are both located in La Mesa.

== Barrio Chino ==
La Mesa Barrio Chino is a Chinese enclave and home to 15,000 ethnic Chinese immigrants as of 2012, a number that has tripled from about 5,000 in 2009. The enclave is the second largest in Tijuana after the American expatriate enclave. The mayor of Tijuana had received negative publicity from the local newspapers for his support for the official establishment of the "Barrio Chino" as there is general negative sentiment from locals who view China as a major rival for trade with the United States. There are various official events held during the summer recognizing the area in Tijuana's La Mesa District.

Tijuana's Chinese community started around the late 1800s to the early 1900s when the Chinese immigrants to the United States fled California during a period called the "yellow peril". As Tijuana was a border town, it was an important city towards the establishment of the Mexicali's Chinese community, which at the time, would outnumber Mexicans 2 to 1. Though the numbers were far fewer in Tijuana, thousands would come through Tijuana on their way to Ensenada and Mexicali, a journey usually by foot for 120 miles to the east. By the 1920s, the Chinese numbering around 15,000 would concentrate in Mexicali to avoid the Mexican civil war. Racism would keep the population small for many decades until the early 2000s when Aeromexico would start flying from Mexico City to Tokyo, Japan, with a stop in Tijuana (thus creating a direct flight from Tijuana to Japan). In 2008, the airline started flying from Mexico City to Shanghai with a stop in Tijuana, thus creating a direct link from Tijuana to China. The author has attributed the immigrant Chinese population rise to the direct flight, where there were 5,000 Chinese immigrants in 2009 and 15,000 by 2012. In 2012, the Chinese community started making the enclave known, whereas the community largely kept to itself in years prior. The Chinatown is one of the few recent Chinatowns that was not created from commercial ventures.

== See also ==
- La Mesa, California, an eastern suburb of San Diego
- La Chinesca, the Chinatown in Mexicali
- Chinatowns in Latin America
