= Villa del Campo, Baja California =

Coordinates: 32°30′27″N 116°44′18″W

Villa del Campo – Town of the Country – is a neighborhood in Baja California in Tijuana Municipality. The neighborhood had a population of 13,906 as of 2010.
