= List of Puerto Rican women writers =

This is a list of women writers who were born in Puerto Rico or whose writings are closely associated with that country.

== A ==
- Silvia Álvarez Curbelo (born 1940), historian, non-fiction writer
- Isabel Andreu de Aguilar (1887–1948), suffragist, feminist writer
- Marta Aponte Alsina (born 1945), writer
- Delma S. Arrigoitia (1945–2023), historian, biographer
- Yolanda Arroyo Pizarro (born 1970), novelist, short story writer, essayist

== B ==
- Marilyn Batista Márquez (born 1959), journalist, short story writer
- Janette Becerra (born 1965), short story writer, poet, critic
- Alejandrina Benítez de Gautier (1819–1879), poet
- María Bibiana Benítez (1783–1873), Puerto Rico's first female poet, playwright
- Giannina Braschi (born 1953), novelist, poet, essayist, playwright
- Julia de Burgos (1914–1953), acclaimed poet, activist

== C ==
- Zenobia Camprubí (1887–1956), Spanish-born poet, diarist, translator
- Luisa Capetillo (1879–1922), anarchist, feminist writer
- Caridad de la Luz (born 1977), Nuyorican poet, actress, activist
- Edna Coll (1906–2002), educator, writer of literary works
- Isabel Cuchí Coll (1904–1993), playwright, short story writer, journalist, non-fiction writer

== D ==
- Jaquira Díaz, fiction writer, essayist, author of Ordinary Girls

== E ==
- Sandra María Esteves (born 1948), Nuyorican poet, artist

== F ==
- Rosario Ferré (1938–2016), novelist, essayist, poet, educator
- Isabel Freire de Matos (1915–2004), educator, journalist, children's writer, independence activist

== G ==
- Gilda Galán (1917–2009), actress, playwright, poet
- Magali García Ramis (born 1946), short story writer, journalist, novelist, essayist
- Migene González-Wippler, since the 1980s, books on the Santería religious sect in Spanish and English

== J ==
- Zoé Jiménez Corretjer, since the 1980s: poet, short story writer, essayist

== L ==
- Georgina Lázaro (born 1965), journalist, novelist, poet, children's writer
- Aurora Levins Morales (born 1954), poet, biographer, non-fiction writer, feminist
- Teresita A. Levy (born 1970), educator, historian, author of The History of Tobacco Cultivation in Puerto Rico, 1898-1940.

== M ==
- Nemir Matos-Cintrón (born 1949), poet
- Concha Meléndez (1895–1983), poet, essayist, educator
- Nancy Mercado (born 1959), Post-Beat writer, Nuyorican poet, essayist, fiction writer, playwright, editor, activist
- Mayra Montero (born 1952), journalist, novelist, short story writer
- Nicholasa Mohr (born 1938), Nuyorican novelist, children's writer, short story writer
- Rosario Morales (1930–2011), poet, essayist, raised in New York City

== N ==
- Vionette Negretti (born 1947), journalist, writer
- Frances Negrón-Muntaner (born 1966), film-maker, literary critic, essayist, screenwriter
- Mercedes Negrón Muñoz (1895–1973), poet

== O ==
- Ana María O'Neill (1894–1981), educator, women's rights activist, non-fiction author
- Judith Ortiz Cofer (1952–2016), poet, short story writer, essayist, children's writer, autobiographer, educator

== P ==
- Olivia Paoli (1855–1942), suffragist, magazine editor

== R ==
- Tania Ramos González (born 1971), author, academic, former dancer

== S ==
- Esmeralda Santiago (born 1948), novelist, memoirist, actress
- Mayra Santos-Febres (born 1966), poet, essayist, short story writer, novelist
- Mercedes Sola (1879–1923), educator, women's rights activist, feminist writer

== T ==
- Luisita Lopez Torregrosa (born 1943), journalist, memoirist

== U ==
- Luz María Umpierre (born 1947), poet, critic, human rights activist

== V ==
- Lourdes Vázquez (born 1949), since the 1980s, short story writer, novelist, poet essayist
- Ana Lydia Vega (born 1946), acclaimed short story writer, essayist
- Irene Vilar (born c.1969), editor, memoirist, author of The Ladies' Gallery: A Memoir of Family Secrets

== Z ==
- Iris Zavala (1936–2020), poet, novelist, essayist, non-fiction writer, educator

== See also ==
- List of women writers
- List of Puerto Rican writers
- List of Spanish-language authors
