= Hispanic and Latino American women in journalism =

Hispanic and Latino women in America have been involved in journalism for years, using their multilingual skills to reach across cultures and spread news throughout the 19th century until the common era. Hispanic presses provided information important to the Hispanic and Latin American communities and helped to foster and preserve the cultural values that remain today. These presses also "promoted education, provided special-interest columns, and often founded magazines, publishing houses, and bookstores to disseminate the ideas of local and external writers."

== Early 20th century ==
During the early twentieth century several women along the Texas-Mexican border in Laredo were instrumental in spreading word about their concern for the civil rights of Mexicans and disdain for then dictator, Porfirio Díaz, through their writing in Hispanic newspapers.

Jovita Idar, a teacher in Ojuelos, began to write for her father's newspaper, La Crónica. In 1910 Jovita's family led the organization of the first Mexican Congress in Texas to protect Mexican-American rights and helped to found La Liga Femenil Mexicana, a women's organization led by Idar herself focusing on education reform. At the same time another educator, Leonor Villegas de Magnón, began to write for covert revolutionary publications. Villegas "rejected both the ideals of the aristocratic class and the traditional role assigned to women in Mexican society." After moving to Laredo, she began to write for a local newspaper and became a member of Junta Revolutionaria. Villegras and Idar both worked together in La Cruz Blanca, a small organization that helped wounded soldiers which Villegras founded and financed. As a result, Villegas wrote about the experiences of the nurses and people of Juárez in The Rebel, which was not published until 1994 by Arte Público Press.

Sara Estela Ramírez was an educator who joined Partido Liberal Mexicano, a progressive Mexican political party that consisted of mainly men. She was born in Villa de Progreso, Coahuila, Mexico, in 1881. She completed the public school in Monterrey and graduates in a teachers' college in Saltillo, Coahuila. She was a leader in Partido Liberal Mexicano and she often stand out during the part even when harassment going on. She was also a popular writer among Mexican Americans. Ramírez had her writing published in La Crónica and another Hispanic newspaper, El Democrata Fronterizo, including two of her own self-publications, La Corregidora and Aurora. Ramírez's most popular work was Rise Up!, a poem urging "readers to look beyond traditional definitions of woman’s place [...] It (urged) women to look beyond their role as passive and supportive, finding meaning and action within domestic tasks." During this time, Colombian born Blanca de Moncaleano was also working on Pluma Roja an anarchist newspaper based in Los Angeles that contained articles targeted toward women and challenged them to increase their knowledge to create an egalitarian society.

== 1960-1980 ==
Later, during the Chicano Movement, feminist Anna Nieto-Gómez helped to found a student Chicana newspaper, Hijas de Cuauhtémoc, at California State University in Long Beach and "called for a critical view of sexism, citing its presence in Chicano families, in communities, and within the male-dominated Chicano movement." Through Nieto-Gómez's writing she pointed out what she called "maternal chauvinism" and her views about women and stereotypes about them in the Chicano culture. During this period Francisca Flores, another women's rights activist, began writing for La Luz Magazine and Mas Grafíca. Like Nieto-Gómez, Flores found certain elements of the Chicano movement to be sexist and supported rights for Chicano women. Chicano women refers to the women of Mexican descent who are born and/or raised in the United States. Chicano embraced long history and engaged a lot in the political activist history. They always try to fight the gender inequalities that exist within or outside their identity. With this being said, they are sometimes being discriminated against. Flores wrote about her opinions on women's rights in her own magazine, Regeneración and founded the Comisión Femenil Mexicana Nacional.

== 1980-2010 ==
In 1982, while writing for the Washington Post, Alma Guillermoprieto broke the story of the El Mozote massacre in spite of incredible risk to her life, where Salvadoran armed forces killed hundreds of people who were thought to be guerrilla sympathizers. Guillermoprieto would go on to write for Newsweek and The New Yorker, reporting on subjects in South America.

Marie Arana (born in Lima, Peru, and educated in the U.S.) joined The Washington Post in 1992. She became deputy editor of "Book World" in 1993 and editor in chief of the section in 1999. She also wrote feature pieces on books, Hispanics, and diversity for other sections of the newspaper, including the front page. She retired from editor of "Book World" to become The Washington Post's writer at large in 2009. She has written a series of op-ed columns on Latin America for The New York Times.

- On September 26, 2020, Marie Arana participated in a 39-minute film titled, Reinventing the Festival: National Book Festival 2020Summary: To talk about the ways this book festival and so many others are having to reimagine themselves in the age of COVID-19 and the virtual world, Marie Arana (literary director of the Library of Congress and the National Book Festival) joins Peter Florence (founder of the Hay Festival), Cristina Fuentes La Roche (executive director of the Hay Festival), Mitchell Kaplan (co-founder of the Miami Book Fair) and Lois Kim (executive director of the Texas Book Festival).

In the early 1990s Achy Obejas, a Cuban immigrant who grew up in Indiana, started writing for the Chicago Tribune, Latina, POZ, The Advocate, and reported on high-profile stories such as the Gianni Versace and Matthew Shepard murders. While writing for the Chicago Tribune in 2001, Obejas and her team were eventually awarded a Pulitzer Prize for their work on "Gateway to Gridlock," an article on the American air traffic system. In her writing Obejas was able to detail her experiences as a lesbian, Jewish, and Cuban immigrant in her fiction and short story collections throughout the nineties. With her novel Memory Mambo, Obejas explored the life of a conflicted Cuban American lesbian and won a Lambda Literary Award for her story.

== Presence in journalism ==
66.8% of journalists are white non-Hispanic compared to Hispanic or Latino (12.6%), Asian (9.6%) and Black or African American (6.4%). There are 6,407 journalists currently in United States Many Black Americans say Black journalists are better at understanding them and covering issues related to race. And they think they can contribute a lot to the society.

== See also ==
- National Association of Hispanic Journalists
- Network of Hispanic Communicators
- Feminism in Latin America
