= Liga Social Sufragista =

Liga Social Sufragista (“the Suffragist Social League”), initially named Liga Femínea Puertorriqueña (“The Puerto Rican Feminine League”), was a women's organization on Puerto Rico, founded in 1917.

It was founded by Ana Roque de Duprey in 1917, after suffrage had been introduced at Puerto Rico by the Jones Act exclusively for men. It was the first, and was to become the main, women's suffrage organization in Puerto Rico. They avoided to be seen as radicals by stating that women's role as wives and mothers made them more suited to vote and stand for office.

When women's suffrage was introduced in the US in 1920, the suffragists on Puerto Rico argued that this reform should be applied to Puerto Rico as well, since it was an American dependency, and Milagros Benet de Mewton started a court case in the issue. In 1929, limited suffrage was introduced for literate women, and in 1932, women suffrage was finally introduced for all women.
