= Puerto Rican citizenship and nationality =

Puerto Rico is an island in the Caribbean region in which inhabitants were Spanish nationals from 1508 until the Spanish–American War in 1898, from which point they derived their nationality from United States law. Nationality is the legal means by which inhabitants acquire formal membership in a nation without regard to its governance type; citizenship means the rights and obligations that each owes the other, once one has become a member of a nation. In addition to being United States nationals, persons are citizens of the United States and citizens of the Commonwealth of Puerto Rico within the context of United States Citizenship. Though the Constitution of the United States recognizes both national and state citizenship as a means of accessing rights, (Note: The Constitution of the United States establishes that rights flow from both national and state citizenship, as does the Jones Act for Puerto Ricans. Because federal law, including treaties, overrides other laws within its territorial limits only if those laws are incompatible with national statutes, states historically have been able to grant or withhold rights for various categories of persons residing in their jurisdiction without abridging the Equal Protection Clause. Until the 1960s, differences in legislation among various jurisdictions gave people extremely different civil rights depending upon where they resided.) Puerto Rico's history as a territory has created both confusion over the status of its nationals and citizens and controversy because of distinctions between jurisdictions of the United States. These differences have created what political scientist Charles R. Venator-Santiago has called "separate and unequal" statuses.

== History of nationality in Puerto Rico ==
=== Spanish period (1508–1898) ===
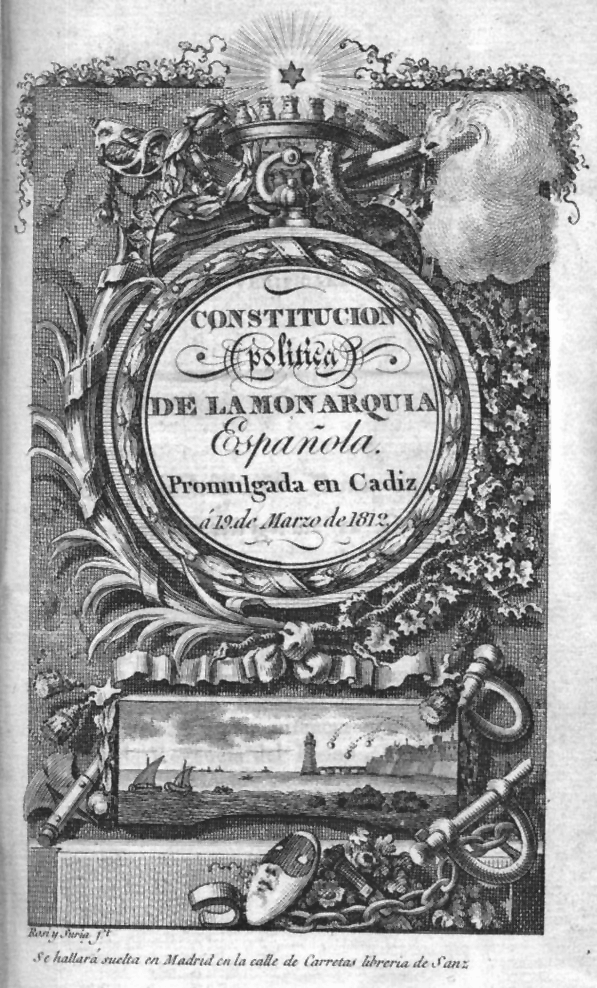
Constitution of Cádiz

Puerto Rico was a Spanish colony for four hundred years, after Spain first established a settlement on the island in 1508. In accordance with the Laws of the Indies, criollos, persons born in the colonies, had fewer rights than peninsulares, those born in Spain. After a governmental reorganization and propagation of the first Spanish constitution, the 1812 Constitution of Cádiz, Puerto Ricans were defined as persons born on the island and their descendants. They were granted an equal status and representation in the Spanish Parliament. Within two years, the constitution was suspended and absolute monarchy returned, along with the former unequal status based upon place of birth. A Royal Charter issued in 1816, invited foreigners to migrate to Puerto Rico to engage in professions and offered them an opportunity to become Spanish citizens, upon request after establishing residency for five years. Foreigners who established a permanent residence in Puerto Rico were considered subjects, neither Spanish-nationals nor native-born, unless they chose to naturalize. The children born in Puerto Rico derived the status of their fathers. If the father naturalized as Spanish, the children were Spanish nationals and if the father retained his foreign nationality, the children were foreign nationals.

Instability in the Spanish Empire resulted in a lengthy period where the Constitution of Cádiz was reinstated and revoked several times, leaving Puerto Rico without specific legal status for its inhabitants until 1873, when the Spanish Constitution of 1869 was extended to the island. This constitution abolished slavery in Puerto Rico and established a bill of rights for inhabitants. It was short-lived and ceased to be effective in 1874, with the restoration of the monarchy. The 1812 Constitution contained provisions for Spain to draft a Civil Code. Numerous attempts were unsuccessful, until a code was finally adopted in 1889. By royal decree on July 31, the Spanish Civil Code was extended to Cuba, the Philippines and Puerto Rico, coming into effect on January 1, 1890. The provisions of the code, in Article 22, required a married woman to derive her nationality from her husband.

=== United States period (1898–present) ===
==== Establishing nationality for Puerto Rico (1898–1952) ====
At the conclusion of the Spanish–American War, under terms of the 1898 Treaty of Paris, the United States acquired control over Cuba, Guam, the Philippines, and Puerto Rico. Prior to signature of the treaty, all persons born in US possessions had been collectively naturalized by the United States. Under the terms of the 1898 Treaty, however, possessions were deemed to be foreign localities and because no collective naturalization was provided, persons living therein were not protected by the Citizenship Clause of the Fourteenth Amendment to the United States Constitution. The language created a new classification of non-citizen US nationals, which applied at the time to Cuba, Guam, the Philippines, and Puerto Rico, and was later extended to include American Samoa, Guam, and the Virgin Islands. In essence, until Congress chose to convey rights of citizenship, inhabitants of possessions were not extended full constitutional rights, but belonged to the United States.

The lack of a collective naturalization clause created a situation which treated inhabitants differently based upon their origin. Spanish nationals born in Spain could opt to remain Spanish, by making a formal declaration within one year of the treaty in a court that they wished to retain their original nationality. Failure to do so, severed the tie to Spain if the person remained in Puerto Rico. Foreigners remained foreign nationals. Persons born in Puerto Rico automatically became US nationals, but according to scholar John L. A. de Passalacqua, had no "citizenship whatsoever recognized under international law or even United States municipal law". In 1900, the US Congress passed the first Organic Act, known as the Foraker Act, to regulate the status of Puerto Rico and establish a civilian government. It created a legislature, over which the US Congress retained authority to annul laws and established that while Puerto Ricans were US nationals, they were territorial citizens. US nationality applied only to those who had renounced Spanish nationality or were already US nationals residing in Puerto Rico. It did not extend to foreigners or those born in Puerto Rico who were residing abroad. The Puerto Rican Civil Code, as did other laws in force at the time, remained applicable in accordance with terms of the Foraker Act. It was replaced in 1902, incorporating portions of the Louisiana Code.

The Civil Code was revised again in 1930, with only slight modifications from the former version and contained provisions for the legal incapacitation of married women until revision in 1976. In 1934, amendments to the Cable Act, which partially provided married women individual nationality, were incorporated into the Equal Nationality Act. Women were allowed under the amendment for their children born abroad to derive their nationality. The 1934 Nationality Act also provided that Puerto Rican women who had been denationalized because of marriage prior to March 2, 1917, the date upon which Puerto Ricans were extended US statutory citizenship, had the option to repatriate. Amendments to the Jones Act, that same year, established that US collective naturalization was extended to all Puerto Ricans born after April 11, 1899, and thereafter naturalization was acquired at birth. Minor changes were made to the Jones Act in 1940 extending US nationality to foreigners who had permanent residency in Puerto Rico. That year the Nationality Act of 1940 codified into a single federal statute, various laws and decisions by the Supreme Court of the United States on nationality, including the status of non-citizen national, clarifying that not all persons with allegiance to the United States were able to acquire the rights and responsibilities of citizenship. It also established the principle that after 1941, all Puerto Ricans acquired US nationality at birth, in a similar manner to other US nationals, no longer through naturalization.

In 1942, a proposed amendment of 1940 Act passed the US House to address the provision with regard to Puerto Ricans for loss of nationality of naturalized persons. Initially, US nationality had not been a birthright for islanders and under the Jones Act they were collectively naturalized. A provision of the 1940 Act denationalized naturalized persons after five years continuous residency abroad, but had no restriction on the length of foreign residence for birthright nationals. To address this discrepancy, the amendment proposed to exclude Puerto Ricans from loss of nationality because of residence abroad. It was referred to committee in the Senate and had no further action. The measure was reintroduced in 1943 and 1946, and was finally successful in exempting Puerto Ricans from denationalization in 1948. The US Immigration and Nationality Act of 1952, codified under Title 8 of the United States Code, revised the wording concerning Puerto Ricans, granting nationality to persons born in Puerto Rico on or after April 11, 1899, and prior to January 13, 1941, who had not been covered in previous legislation, and thereafter to Puerto Ricans at birth. It did not address the status of persons born prior to April 11, 1899.

==== Establishing citizenship for Puerto Rico (1900–1952) ====
In 1900, the territorial legislature passed the Political Code of Puerto Rico, which recognized as Puerto Rican citizens, US nationals permanently living on the island, and former Spanish nationals who had severed ties with Spain, in language identical to the Foraker Act. However, it also contained the primary provision in Title II, Section 10, that anyone born in Puerto Rico "and subject to the jurisdiction thereof" was a Puerto Rican citizen. The US Supreme Court ruled in the Insular Cases (1901–1922), that for unincorporated territories and insular possessions of the United States, which were not on a path toward statehood, the US Constitution did not necessarily apply. Specifically, in Downes v. Bidwell (182 U.S. 244, 1901) the Supreme Court found that though Puerto Rico belonged to the United States, it was not part of it constitutionally because it was "inhabited by alien races, differing from us in religion, customs, laws, methods of taxation and modes of thought and therefore the administration of government and justice, according to Anglo-Saxon principles, may for a time be impossible". In Gonzales v. Williams (192 U.S. 1, 1904) the Supreme Court affirmed that Puerto Ricans were not aliens, or immigrants, causing Congress to pass in 1906, special provisions for persons born in unincorporated territories to naturalize in the United States.

In 1917, the Jones–Shafroth Act established statutory, rather than constitutional, US citizenship, upon US nationals of Puerto Rico and those who might have been absent from the territory at the time of US acquisition, but who had now returned to the island. People who had renounced foreign nationality and were previously Puerto Rican under local law, became stateless under the terms of the Jones Act. In 1922, the US Supreme Court clarified in the case of Balzac v. Porto Rico (258 US 298, 1922) that the full protection and rights of the US Constitution are not applicable to residents of Puerto Rico until they come to reside in the United States proper. Amendments to the Jones Act in 1927 extended naturalization with statutory citizenship to those who had been absent when it was enacted and those whom it had rendered stateless because of residency under previous Spanish law.

In 1950, the US Congress passed Public Law 600, authorizing Puerto Rico to draft its own constitution to regulate its internal affairs. A local referendum was held to determine whether the government should be organized with a commonwealth status. The Constitutional Convention of Puerto Rico established a constitution which had few differences between the relationship of Puerto Rico and the United States. Parts of the Jones Act were repealed, but the remainder ensured that the permanent association with the United States remained.

== Current system ==
=== Nationality Acquisition, Federal Citizenship, and Political Participation ===
By virtue of the various laws passed concerning Puerto Rican nationality and citizenship, Puerto Ricans acquire nationality and federal citizenship by various means. Puerto Rico's territorial status created a more complicated path to federal nationality and citizenship for Puerto Ricans. In Gonzales v. Williams, 192 U.S. 1 (1904), one of the first cases to combat U.S. citizenship for Puerto Ricans, the Supreme Court held that Puerto Ricans were not aliens under federal immigration laws. Congress later formalized this relationship through legislative measures, specifically the Jones Act of 1917, as amended, the Nationality Act of 1940, which granted Puerto Ricans U.S. citizenship ever since by birth in one of the fifty states or District of Columbia.

Unlike U.S. Citizens residing in the States, citizens that reside in Puerto Rico cannot vote for the president in general elections while residing on the island. Puerto Rico itself has no voting representation in the United States Senate, instead, it elects a Resident Commissioner to the House of Representatives, who may participate in certain congressional proceedings but cannot vote on the final passage of legislation. But Puerto Ricans residing on the island can vote during the presidential primary elections, which parties run to select a presidential candidate, this marks the end of island residents' participation in federal elections. Puerto Rican island residents also do not have full protection under the US Constitution, until they come to reside in a U.S. state. Though all residents of Puerto Rico pay some federal taxes, there is less federal assistance available to island citizens through programs like Temporary Assistance for Needy Families, Medicaid, and Supplemental Security Income. Puerto Rico's history as a territory has created both confusion over the status of its citizens and political participation because of distinctions between jurisdictions of the United States. These arrangements distinguish Puerto Rico from the states and the differences have created what political scientist Charles R. Venator-Santiago has called "separate and unequal" statuses, and in an ambiguous liminal status.

The resulting distinctions raises questions about the relationship between citizenship and democratic representation. Puerto ricans living on the island are subject to decisions made by the federal government but cannot vote in the general elections for president or electing members of Congress. By contract, Puerto Ricans who relocate to the States can participate in federal elections provided they meet eligibility requirements. Political participation therefore depends in part on where a U.S. citizen resides, making Puerto Rico's territorial status central to the discussion of citizenship and voting rights.

=== Historical Voting Barriers Puerto Ricans have faced ===
Puerto Ricans who migrated to the mainland historically still encountered voting restrictions that treated English literacy as a condition of political participation. Before the Voting Rights Act of 1965, English-speaking U.S. citizens could qualify through an English literacy test or qualifying educational credentials, creating a voting barrier to Spanish-speaking applicants, mostly Puerto Ricans. In Cardona v. Power, 384 U.S. 672 (1966), Martha Cardona challenged the English literacy requirement in New York. In 1921, New York adopted a voting law that made it difficult for Puerto Ricans to exercise their right to vote by requiring proof that they had completed at least “sixth grade at an approved elementary or high school where English was the primary language of instruction.” Martha Cardona was a Puerto Rican-born U.S. citizen who had moved to New York City in 1948. When she tried to register to vote, she was denied due to not satisfying the New York’s English literacy requirement. Martha could only read and write in Spanish, the dominant language of Puerto Rico. Martha sued in New York state court, arguing that the English literacy requirement violated the U.S. Constitution, but lower state courts and New York Court of Appeals rejected her claim.

After Congress enacted Section 4(e) of the Voting Rights Act of 1965, the Supreme Court vacated the judgment against Martha Cardona and remanded the case for further proceedings. Section 4(e) prohibited the English literacy requirements being applied to individuals who had completed the sixth grade in qualifying Puerto Rican schools where the language of instruction was other than English.

The constitutional dispute over the protection of Puerto Rican voters arose in Morgan v. Katzenbach, 247 F. Supp. 196 (D.D.C. 1965), which challenged Section 4(e) of the Voting Rights Act of 1965. The case involved a challenge to § 4(e) of the Voting Rights Act of 1965, which protected individuals who had completed at least the sixth grade in a Puerto Rican school where Spanish was the primary language of instruction from being denied the right to vote because they could not read or write English. John and Christine Morgan, registered New York voters, challenged the constitutionality of § 4(e), arguing that Congress had exceeded its constitutional authority by interfering with New York's power to regulate its elections. The District Court's majority held the provision unconstitutional because Congress exceeded its authority by interfering with the states' power to establish voting qualifications. Judge McGowan dissented, arguing that Congress possessed authority under the Constitution's Territorial Clause to protect the voting rights of Puerto Rican citizens who migrated to the mainland. His dissent recognized that Puerto Ricans' territorial relationship with the United States could distinguish their legal position from that of other citizens. Judge McGowan wrote that citizens subject to Congress's territorial authority were “inescapably and legitimately separated by that fact” from citizens outside that authority. The passage illustrates the relationship between Puerto Rican citizenship and federal power: Puerto Ricans were U.S. citizens, yet their territorial origins affected the legal questions surrounding their political rights.

Judge McGowan also quoted Balzac v. People of Porto Rico, 258 U.S. (1922) (part of the Insular Cases), where the Supreme Court once stated that the purpose of the Jones Act was to place Puerto Ricans “on an exact equality with citizens from the American homeland, to secure them more certain protection against the world, and to give them an opportunity, should they desire, to move into the United States proper and there without naturalization to enjoy all political and other rights."

The Supreme Court ultimately reversed the district court in Katzenbach v. Morgan, 384 U.S. 641 (1966), upholding Congress's authority to enact Section 4(e). Together with Cardona v. Power, the opinions demonstrate how language requirements could impede mainland Puerto Ricans' political participation and how federal intervention could protect their access to the ballot.

=== Recent Challenges to Voting Rights ===
The distinction between U.S. citizenship and political participation continues to shape Puerto Rico's relationship with the federal government. Residents of the island remain unable to vote for president in the general election and lack voting representation in Congress, while federal laws and policies can significantly affect their lives. Puerto Rico exercises local self-government, but Congress has broad authority over the territory under the Territorial Clause of the U.S. Constitution. The Supreme Court's decision in United States v. Vaello Madero, 596 U.S. 159 (2022), which upheld the exclusion of Puerto Rico residents from Supplemental Security Income (SSI) under the constitutional challenge before it, shows how territorial status continues to affect the treatment of U.S. citizens under federal law. The Court concluded that Congress had a rational basis for the different treatment under the Fifth Amendment's equal-protection component.

Challenges to Puerto Rico's exclusion from federal elections have continued through a series of court cases known as the Igartúa cases. Puerto Rican residents argued that as U.S. citizens, they should have the right to vote for president and elect voting representatives to the House of Representatives.

In Igartúa-de la Rosa v. United States, 417 F.3d 145 (1st Cir. 2005), an en banc decision, the First Circuit rejected the claim that residents of Puerto Rico had a constitutional right to vote for the president because the Constitution's Electoral College system gives states, not territories, the role of choosing presidential electors.

In Igartúa v. United States, 626 F.3d 592 (1st Cir. 2010), the First Circuit also rejected the argument that Puerto Rico residents had a constitutional right to elect voting members of the House because Puerto Rico is not a state. Further challenges followed in Igartúa v. Obama, 842 F.3d 149 (1st Cir. 2016), and related proceedings. In the dissent by Judge Juan Torruella, he described the situation as the “total national disenfranchisement” of U.S. citizens living in Puerto Rico. Although this statement reflected Judge Torruella’s criticism of the court’s ruling, it highlights the central issue: Puerto Ricans living on the island are U.S. citizens, but they cannot vote for president or elect voting members of Congress.

The Igartúa cases show that these limits on political participation have been challenged in court, but the courts have refused to recognized the constitutional right to federal electoral participation that Puerto Ricans sought.

=== Relinquishing United States nationality ===
United States citizens are allowed to give up their nationality and citizenship if the act is voluntary and intentional. Over time, 287 residents of Puerto Rico have formally renounced their nationality. Since 1990, the US State Department presumes no intention to give up nationality, even when a person has performed a potentially expatriating act. Renunciation requires making a formal declaration, which is sworn before a designated authority in the United States during a time of war, or abroad at any time to a consular officer; attending an interview and counseling session; payment of a fee; and signing requisite documents.

In 1994, Juan Mari Brás flew to Venezuela and renounced his US nationality, in an attempt to rid himself from what he saw as the colonialism inherent in Puerto Ricans being considered U.S. nationals. In 1995, he was issued a Certificate of Loss of Nationality by the State Department. In 1996, the Secretary of Justice issued clarification on the matter to the Governor of Puerto Rico confirming that nationality in a sovereign state is not the same as state or territorial citizenship. Further, because Puerto Rico falls under the sovereignty of the United States, renunciation of his nationality left him stateless and it would require a decision of the US Immigration and Naturalization Service, as to whether he could obtain a visa to remain in Puerto Rico after renunciation. In the US District Court for the District of Columbia a decision in Davis v. District Director (481 F. Supp. 1178, D.D.C., 1979) determined that renunciation of US nationality rendered the person an alien without right to remain in the country without a valid visa. The same district court upheld similar findings in Colón v. U.S. Department of State (2 F. Supp. 2d 43, D.D.C., 1998), ruling that US nationality cannot be renounced if it is the intent of a petitioner to reside in Puerto Rico and allege that they can do so because they have Puerto Rican citizenship. Shortly thereafter, because Mari Brás wished to remain in Puerto Rico, the State Department reversed its decision to accept his renunciation.

=== Domestic citizenship ===
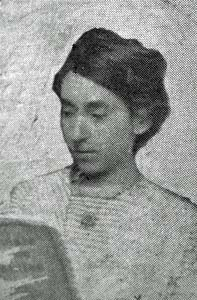
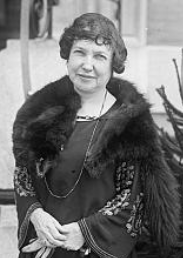
Puerto Rican suffragists Isabel Andreu de Aguilar (left) and Milagros Benet de Mewton (right)

Since 1900, with the establishment of the territorial legislature under the terms of the Foraker Act, and development of the Political Code of Puerto Rico, domestic citizenship has been recognized and was later recognized in the Constitution of Puerto Rico. When women gained the right to vote in the United States in 1919, the Bureau of Insular Affairs confirmed that their new constitutional right did not extend to unincorporated territories. The US Supreme Court confirmed in the Insular Cases that extension of the franchise was bound by the terms in the Foraker Act. Puerto Rican suffragists and their supporters, led by women such as Isabel Andreu de Aguilar, Rosario Bellber, and Milagros Benet de Mewton, among others, introduced women's suffrage legislation in 1919, 1921, 1923, and 1927 without success. De Mewton sued the Electoral Board in 1924 for refusing to allow her to register, but the Supreme Court of Puerto Rico ruled against her on the grounds that the legislature had the authority to determine who were eligible voters in the island. Appealing to the United States legislature, suffragists pressed for federal legislation for the right to vote. When the US House introduced legislation in 1928, the Puerto Rican legislature agreed to review the issue. They passed a bill in 1929 to extend the franchise to women, limited to those who were literate. Universal suffrage was finally granted in Puerto Rico in 1936.

The constitution adopted in 1952 provided citizens of the Commonwealth with a bill of rights consistent with the US Constitution. Acts of the Puerto Rican government must conform to federal requirements, but they are able to exercise self-governance in a manner similar to all states in the federal system. In 1997, during his quest to divest himself of US nationality, Mari Brás attempted to redefine Puerto Rican citizenship and have it recognized as nationality. In the case of Miriam J. Ramirez de Ferrer v. Juan Mari Brás (144 DPR 141, 1997) the Supreme Court of Puerto Rico reaffirmed that Puerto Rican citizenship existed, but that it existed in the context of a US nationality. The ruling confirmed that citizenship in the island was dependent on both US citizenship and residency in Puerto Rico. The day prior to the ruling, Puerto Rico's Political Code had been amended with similar language. Since the summer of 2007, the Puerto Rico State Department has developed a protocol to grant Puerto Rican citizenship certificates to Puerto Ricans. Certificates of Puerto Rican citizenship are issued on request by the Puerto Rico State Department to confirm a person's citizenship status in Puerto Rico to any persons born on the island and subject to its jurisdiction, as well as to those born outside of the island that have at least one parent who was born on the island.

==== Dual Citizenship - U.S. and Puerto Rican citizenship ====
The official policy of the United States Government allows dual nationality and recognizes that it exists. The US government does not officially endorse a policy for multiple nationalities of its nationals. On October 25, 2006, Mari Brás became the first person to receive a Certificate of Puerto Rican Citizenship from the Puerto Rico Department of State. The Certificate of Puerto Rican Citizenship can be used to obtain dual nationality in Spain, as it is considered proof of Ibero-American heritage. Under the Spanish statutes known as Organic Law 4/2000 and Royal Decree 557/2011, persons who have historic ties to Spain and can demonstrate their origin in an Ibero-American country can be naturalized without renouncing their previous nationality.

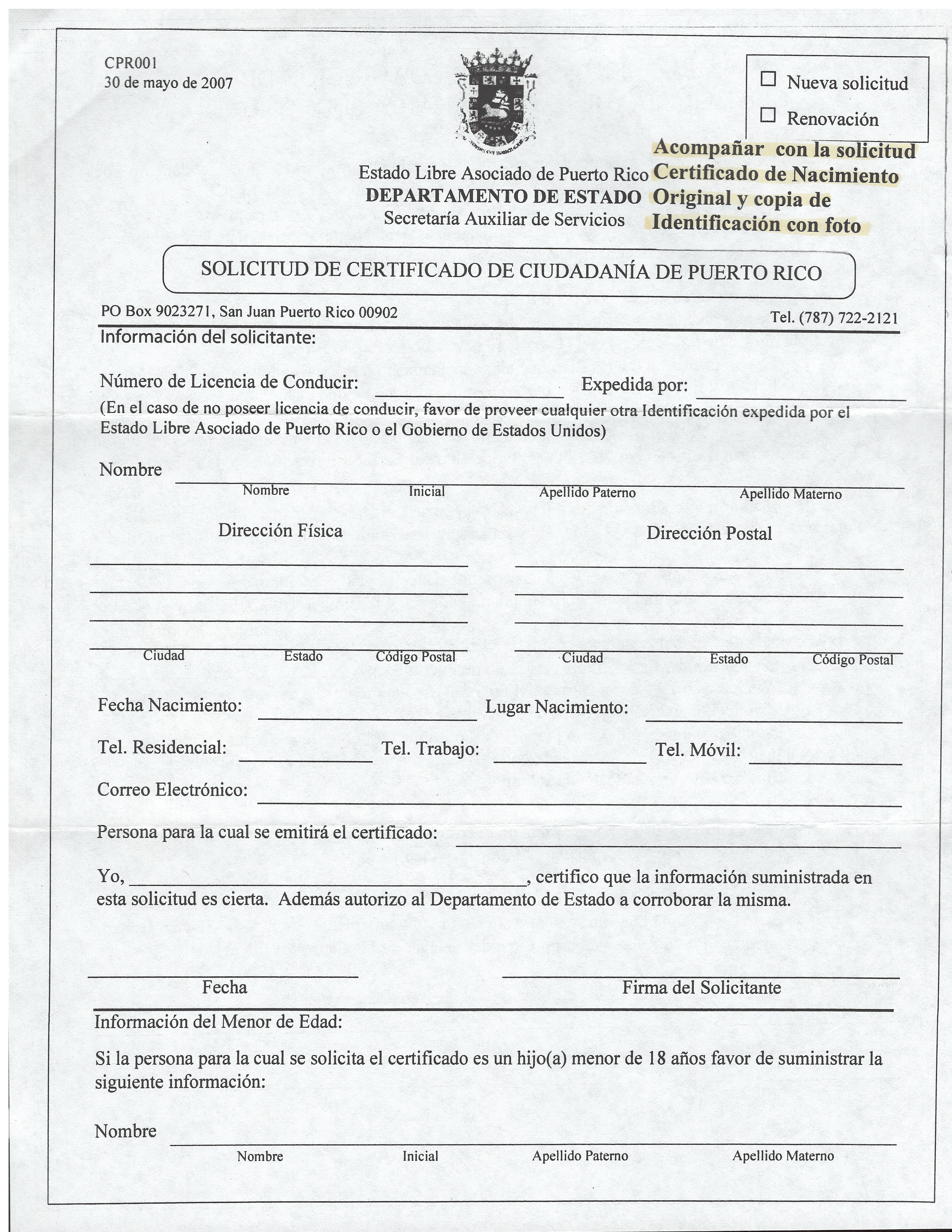
Application form for the
Certificate of Puerto Rican Citizenship

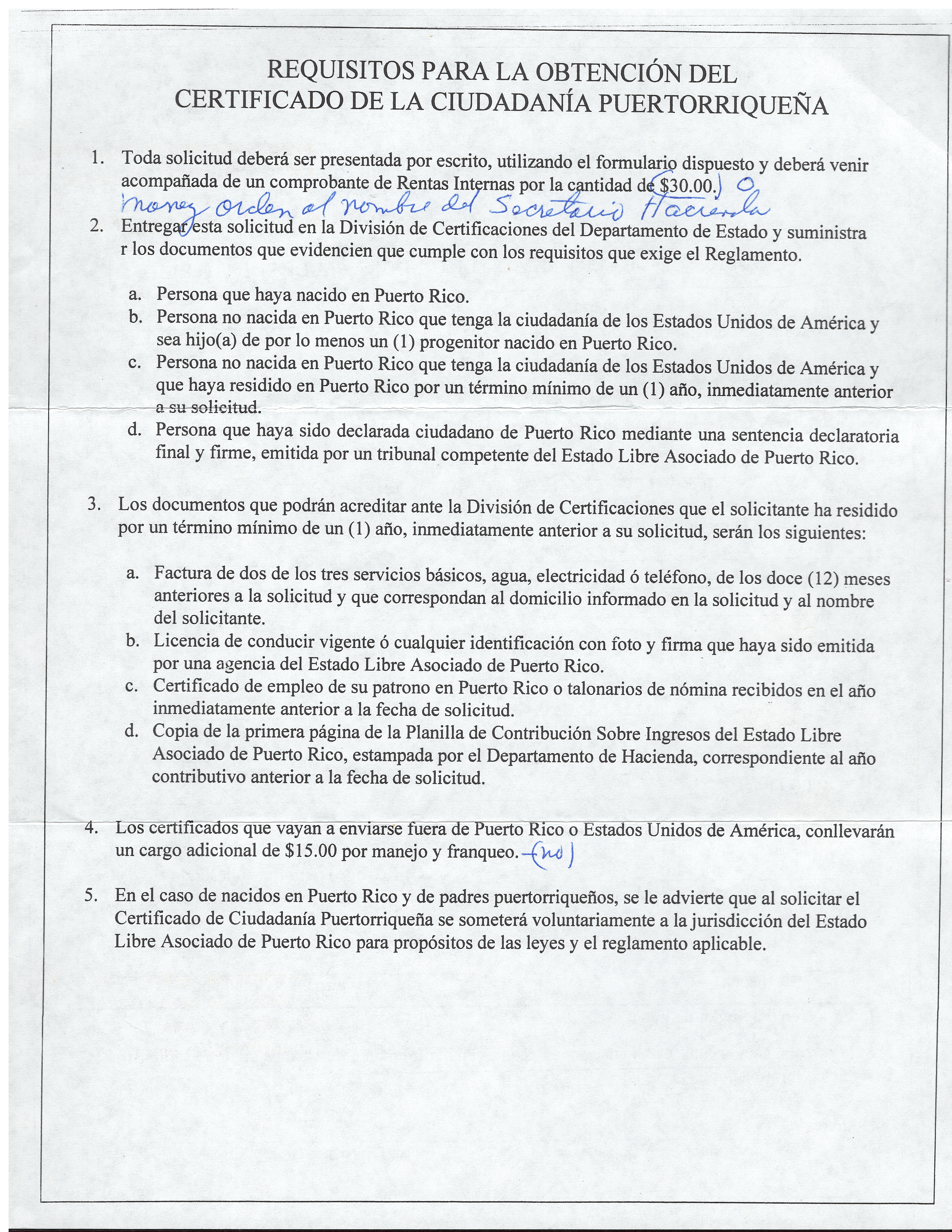
Reverse side of the application form for the
Certificate of Puerto Rican Citizenship

== See also ==
- Santori v. United States
- Demographics of Puerto Rico
- Independence movement in Puerto Rico
- Statehood movement in Puerto Rico
