= Mercedes Sola =

Puerto Rican suffragist (1879–1923)

Mercedes Solá Rodríguez (1879 – October 27, 1923) was a Puerto Rican writer, educator, and activist for the rights of women. Along with Isabel Andreu de Aguilar (1887–1948) and Ana Roque de Duprey (1853–1933), Sola was a feminist recognized in 1917 for the founding of the Puerto Rican League of Women. Sola, Andreu de Aguilar and Ana Roque de Duprey, along with others, brought about the passage of the country's suffrage bill. She was one of the main architects of the suffragette campaign in Puerto Rico from the 1920s, and was a leader of the Puerto Rican Woman's Suffrage Association. In 1922, she published Feminismo, in which she demanded the woman's right to vote in the society of his country; it is considered a landmark text in contemporary feminism. She was also co-founder of the feminist magazine Women of the Twentieth Century, which aimed at defending the rights of women.
