= Rose Arce =

American journalist and documentary producer

Rose Marie Arce is an American journalist and documentary producer. She is vice president of Soledad O'Brien Productions, the production company of journalist Soledad O'Brien. She previously spent nearly 15 years at CNN as a senior producer. Earlier in her career she worked at CBS News, WCBS-TV, New York Newsday, and the New York Daily News. Arce has won a Pulitzer Prize, three Emmy Awards, and a Peabody Award.

== Early life and education ==
Arce's parents are Peruvian immigrants. She grew up in the Washington, D.C. area and attended McLean High School in Virginia, where she worked on the school newspaper. She graduated from Barnard College in 1986.

== Career ==
Arce started out in community journalism at a newspaper in upstate New York in the mid-1980s, then reported on police and education for the New York Daily News before joining New York Newsday. At Newsday, she was part of the staff that covered the 1991 Union Square derailment; they won the 1992 Pulitzer Prize for Spot News Reporting.

She moved into television as a producer at WCBS-TV, winning two Emmy Awards for investigative reports on abortion and policing, and then worked at CBS News.

At CNN, where she worked from the late 1990s until roughly 2013, Arce covered the 2010 Haiti earthquake, the war in Afghanistan, and other breaking stories. On September 11, 2001, she ran from her Lower Manhattan apartment toward the World Trade Center and reported live on the air for CNN throughout the day; the National Academy of Television Arts and Sciences later recognized her as one of the few reporters broadcasting from Ground Zero all day. Her account of that day is included in the book Women at Ground Zero (2002). At CNN she also produced documentaries including parts of the Black in America (2008) and Latino in America (2009) series, Her Name Was Steven (2010), and Beyond Bravery: The Women of 9/11 (2011).

Since leaving CNN, Arce has worked with Soledad O'Brien at what is now Soledad O'Brien Productions (SO'B Productions). Producing credits include The Perfect Neighbor (2025), which was nominated for Best Documentary Feature at the 98th Academy Awards and won five Critics' Choice Documentary Awards, and The Devil Is Busy (HBO, 2024), nominated for Best Documentary Short Film.

Arce has taught journalism at the Columbia University Graduate School of Journalism and the Craig Newmark Graduate School of Journalism at CUNY. She has also held leadership roles with the National Association of Hispanic Journalists and the National Lesbian and Gay Journalists Association.

== Books ==
- Bebés Preciosos: 5001 Hispanic baby names (Avon Books, 1995) Arce and Maité Junco; ISBN 0380778432
- Latino in America (Celebra, 2009), Soledad O'Brien with Arce – publisher description: "the definitive tie-in to one of the most heavily anticipated CNN documentaries"
- The Next Big Story: my journey through the land of possibilities (New American Library, 2010), Soledad O'Brien with Arce

== See also ==
- Hispanic and Latino American women in journalism
