= Luisita Lopez Torregrosa =

Puerto Rican author and journalist

Luisita López Torregrosa
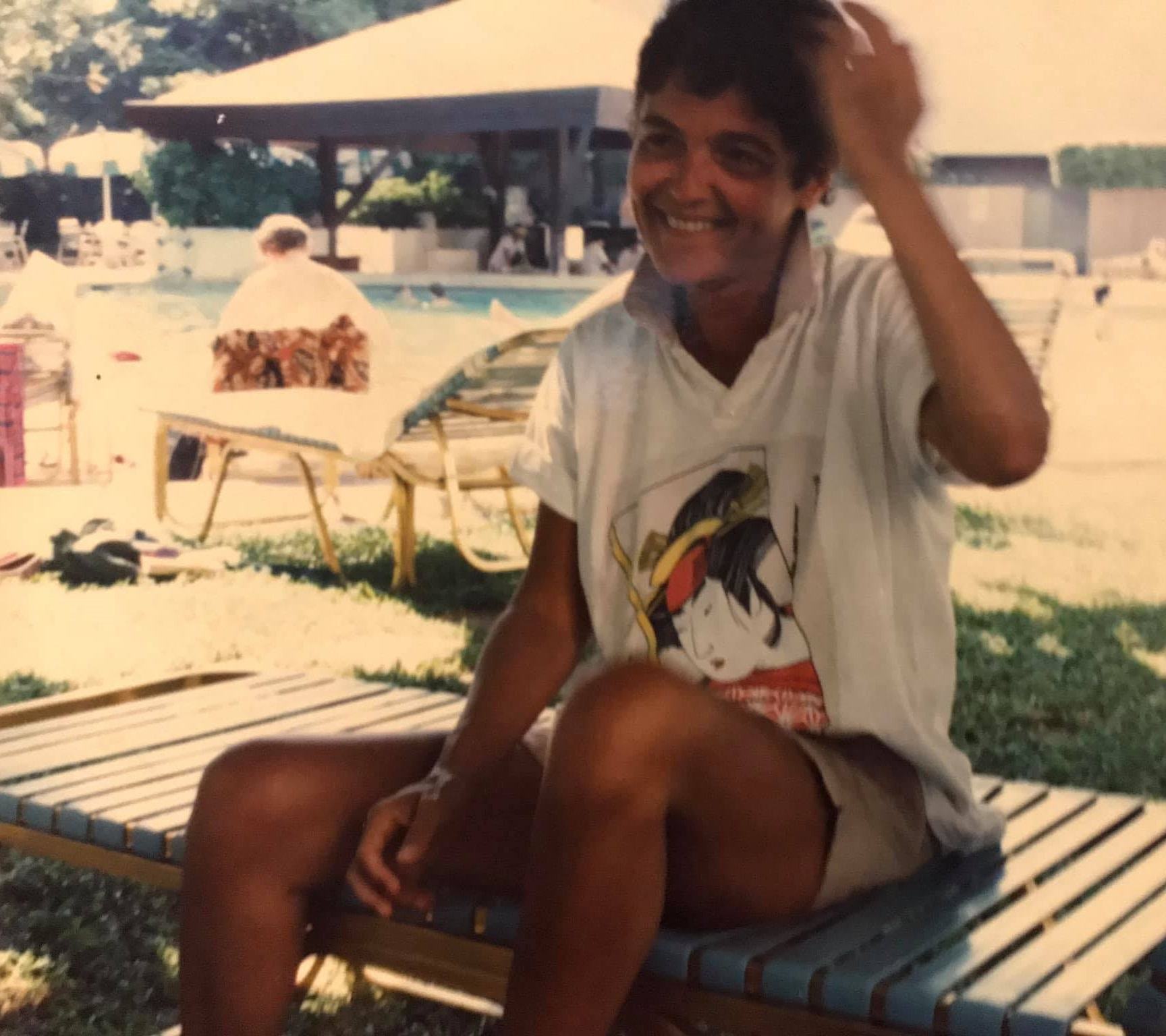
- Luisita Lopez-Torregrosa in Manila, The Philippines (1986)
- Born: 1943 (age 82–83); Puerto Rico
- Occupations: author, journalist
- Writing career
- Notable works: The Noise of Infinite Longing; Before the Rain

Luisita López Torregrosa (born 1943) is a Puerto Rican journalist, book author, editor, freelance writer, and professor. She has reported from the Philippines, Indonesia, Malaysia, Japan, South Korea, Brazil, Cuba, and Puerto Rico. She has lived in Manila, Tokyo, and the United States. She is the author of The Noise of Infinite Longing, published by Rayo/HarperCollins in 2004, and Before the Rain: A Memoir of Love and Revolution, which was published by Houghton Mifflin Harcourt in 2012 and nominated for best lesbian memoir at the 25th Lambda Literary Awards.

== Life ==
Luisita López Torregrosa is the daughter of Amaury López, who was a doctor, and of María Luisa Torregrosa, who was a beauty contest winner, lawyer, and founder of Farándula Bohemia, a touring theater company in Puerto Rico. She is one of six siblings and grew up in Puerto Rico and Mexico City. She went to boarding school at the age of fourteen at Linden Hall Academy, an all girls prep school outside Philadelphia, as she describes in her memoir The Noise of Infinite Longing.

Torregrosa received a BA in English and journalism from Winthrop University in South Carolina in 1964. She has taught as an adjunct professor at the Columbia University Graduate School of Journalism, at Fordham University, and at the University of Miami. She has also been an assistant national editor and assistant styles editor at The New York Times, a contributing editor at Vanity Fair, a contributor at Condé Nast Traveler, and a reporter for NBC News. Her memoir Before the Rain: A Memoir of Love and Revolution focuses on a relationship with a woman writer that led Torregrosa to live in the Philippines during the fall of president Ferdinand Marcos. Her memoirs have been analyzed by scholars such as Lourdes Torres and Carmen Haydée Rivera. She has also been interviewed by leading Puerto Rican book critics such as Carmen Dolores Hernández.

== Publications ==
- The Noise of Infinite Longing: A Memoir of a Family--and an Island. New York: Rayo/HarperCollins, 2004. ISBN 0060534605
- Before the Rain: A Memoir of Love and Revolution. Boston: Houghton Mifflin Harcourt, 2012. ISBN 9780547669205

== See also ==
- Hispanic and Latino American women in journalism
- LGBT literature
- List of Puerto Ricans
- List of gay, lesbian or bisexual people
- List of LGBT writers
- List of Puerto Rican women writers
- List of Puerto Rican writers
- Puerto Rican literature
- Puerto Ricans in the United States
