= Marta Aponte Alsina =

Puerto Rican storyteller, novelist and literary critic

- Alma mater: University of California, Los Angeles; University of Puerto Rico; New York University
- Occupation: Writer

Marta Aponte Alsina (22 November 1945 Cayey, Puerto Rico) is a storyteller, novelist and literary critic.

== Life ==
Her parents were Ismael Aponte Meléndez and Ana María Alsina Díaz. She studied Comparative Literature at the University of Puerto Rico, Río Piedras Campus. In 1971, she obtained a degree in Regional Planning at the University of California, Los Angeles (UCLA). In 1979, she studied at the New York University (NYU), where she obtained a degree in Latin American Literature.

She was the executive director of two publishing houses in her country: the Institute of Puerto Rican Culture Press, and the University of Puerto Rico Press. In addition to writing, she continues to work as an editor and translator.

She is a member of the board of directors of the Latin American Writers Network (RELAT), an organization founded in 1998, based in Lima, Peru, and affiliated with the Women's World Organization for Rights, Literature and Development.

== Awards ==
- 2008. National Novel Prize, 2007. PEN Club de Puerto Rico. for: Sexto sueño.
- 2000. Prize of the Institute of Puerto Rican Literature, 1999. for: La casa de la loca y otros relatos.
- 1971. Magazine Award. for: "Notas para un estudio ideológico de las novelas de Manuel Zeno Gandía".

== Works ==
=== Novels ===
- 2018. PR 3: Aguirre. (Hybrid historical novel, includes interviews.) Cayey, Puerto Rico: Editorial Sopa de Letras. ISBN 9781641310499
- 2015. La muerte feliz de William Carlos Williams. Cayey, Puerto Rico: Sopa de Letras. ISBN 9781618875846
- 2012. Sobre mi cadáver. San Juan: La secta de los perros. ISBN 9781618872203
- 2010. El fantasma de las cosas. San Juan: Terranova Editores. ISBN 9781935163930, OCLC 801037859
- 2007. Sexto sueño. Madrid: Editorial Veintisiete Letras.
- 2004. Vampiresas. Caracas: Ediciones Alfaguara.
- 1996. El Cuarto Rey Mago. Editorial Sopa de Letras.
- 1994. Angélica furiosa. Editorial Sopa de Letras.

=== Stories ===
- 2005. Fúgate (relatos). Editorial Sopa de Letras.
- 2001. La casa de la loca y otros relatos. Mexico: Ediciones Alfaguara.
- 1999. La casa de la loca (relatos). Editorial Sopa de Letras.

== See also ==
- List of Puerto Ricans
- List of Puerto Rican writers
- List of Puerto Rican women writers
- Puerto Rican literature
