= Lourdes Vázquez =

Puerto Rican writer (born 1949)

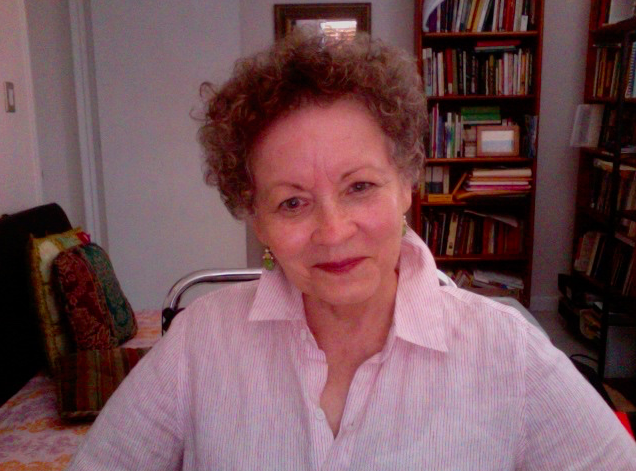
- Born: 1949; Santurce, Puerto Rico
- Occupations: Short story writer, novelist, poet, essayist
- Children: 2, Omar Acosta
- Writing career
- Notable works: Bestiary: Selected Poems 1986-1997; Not Myself Without You; Un enigma esas muñecas Adagio con fugas y ciertos afectos"

Lourdes Vázquez (born 1949) is a Puerto Rican poet, fiction and essayist writer and a resident of the United States. Her poetry, short stories and essays have been published in numerous magazines and anthologies. Her many collections, which have been translated into English and Italian by writers such as Bethany Korps-Edwards, Rosa Alcalá, Enriqueta Carrington and Brigidina Gentile have received excellent reviews. She is Librarian Emeritus of Rutgers University.

== Collaborations ==
Vázquez has collaborated with a group of artists. Some of these collaborations include the artist's book, Salmos del cuerpo ardiente by Consuelo Gotay (2007) and the videos Meche en doble luna llena (2006) by Adál Maldonado and Cat = Cat (2006) by Andrea Hasselager. She has also collaborated twice with Yarisa Colón Torres: Cibeles que sueña=Cybele, As She Dreams (35 copies, measuring 10" length x 6" width, translated by Enriqueta Carrington) and The Tango Files (35 copies, January 6, 2014, front cover by Yarisa Colón).

== Awards ==
In 1988 Vázquez's book Las Hembras (1987) was selected by El Nuevo Día newspaper as one of the Puerto Rican ten best books of the year, and Aterrada de cuernos y cuervos, a biography of the poet Marina Arzola, received the same distinction in 1990. In 2001, Vázquez was awarded the "50 Most Distinguished Latinas in the Tri-State Area Award" by El Diario-La Prensa newspaper (NY). She was the winner of the Juan Rulfo Short Story Award (France) in 2002: category Literate World. In 2004, her Bestiary: Selected Poems 1986-1997 received an Honorable Mention in the Foreword Reviews Book of the Year Awards. Bestiary was selected also as one of the "May–June 2004 Picks" by the Small Press Review. Her novel Sin ti no soy yo is part of The New Essential Guide to Spanish Reading (2012), compiled by the organization, America Reads Spanish and its English translation Not Myself Without You was selected as part of LatinoStories.com's "2013 Top Ten New Latino Authors to Watch". Vázquez was awarded the Honorable Mention for the National Poetry Series 2014 Paz Prize for Poetry as well as an Honorable Mention for the Premio Luis Lloréns Torres, Casa de los Poetas, 2014 (PR).

== Archives ==
In 2008 the Library and Archives of the Center for Puerto Rican Studies / CUNY invited her to donate her documents. See: Center for Puerto Rican Studies, Library and Archives, Collection Descriptions. (https://centropr.hunter.cuny.edu/collections/collection-descriptions-t-z)

== Publications ==
- La rosa mecánica. Rio Piedras, P.R.: Ediciones Huracán, 1991. ISBN 0929157141
- Historias de Pulgarcito. Río Piedras, P.R.: Editorial Cultural, 1999.
- Hablar sobre Julia: Julia de Burgos: bibliografía 1934- 2002. Austin, TX: SALALM Secretariat, 2002. ISBN 0917617681
- Desnudo con Huesos=Nude with Bones. La Candelaria, 2003.
- Park Slope. Duration Press 2003.
- May the transvestites of my island... Translation by Rosa Alcalá. New York: Belladona Press, 2004.
- Obituario. Babab, 2004.
- Bestiary: Selected Poems 1986-1997. Translation by Rosa Alcalá. Tempe: Bilingual Review Press, 2004. ISBN 193101020X
- La estatuilla. San Juan, PR: Cultural, 2004. ISBN 1567581331
- Salmos del cuerpo ardiente. Chihuahua Arde, 2004.
- Salmos del cuerpo ardiente: An Artist Book by Consuelo Gotay. 2007.
- Samandar: libro de viajes=Book of Travel. Translation by Enriqueta Carrington. Buenos Aires: Tsé Tsé, 2007. ISBN 9789871057610
- Tres cuentos y un infortunio. Argentina: Fundación A. Ross, 2009. ISBN 9789871133796
- Compiladora antología: Narradoras latinoamericanas en Estados Unidos. Argentina: Fundación A. Ross, 2009. vol. I ISBN 9789871133819; Vol II ISBN 9789871133802
- Una muñeca de cerámica…=A porcelain doll.... Wheelhouse Press, 2009.
- La mujer, el pan y el pordiosero. México: Eón, 2010. ISBN 9786079124083
- Sin ti no soy yo. (Second Revised Edition.) El Gallo Rojo, 2012. ISBN 9781475137750
- Not Myself Without You. Translation by Bethany Korps-Edwards. Tempe, AZ: Bilingual Review Press, 2012. ISBN 9781931010689
- Appunti dalla Terra Frammentata = Registros del Broken-Up Land. Translation by Manuela Derosas. Italy: EDIBOM Edizione Letterarie, Serie Collana Isla, 2012.
- Le Extrait I. Ca: El Gallo Rojo, 2014. Translation by Philippe Burgos. ISBN 9781495940552
- Adagio con fugas y ciertos afectos: mis mejores cuentos. Madrid: Editorial Verbum, 2013. ISBN 9788479629014
- Un enigma esas muñecas. Madrid: Torremozas, 2015. ISBN 9788478396016
- The Tango Files. Italia: Edizione Arcoiris, 2016. ISBN 978-88-96583-96-8
- El atardecer de los planetas azules. San Juan: Los libros de la Iguana, 2018. ISBN 978-1-7325539-003
- Orígenes de los eterno y así las cosas. Madrid: Verbum, 2020. ISBN 978-84-1337-356-0

== See also ==
- List of Puerto Ricans
- List of Puerto Rican women writers
- List of Puerto Rican writers
- Puerto Rican literature
- Puerto Ricans in the United States
