= Impossible Motherhood =

2009 memoir by Irene Vilar

- Author: Irene Vilar
- Language: English
- Genre: Memoir
- Publisher: Other Press
- Publication date: October 6, 2009
- Publication place: United States
- ISBN: 978-1-59051-320-0
- Dewey Decimal: 616.85/84 B 22
- LC Class: HQ767 .V55 2009
- Preceded by: The Ladies’ Gallery
- Followed by: N/A

Impossible Motherhood (full title: Impossible Motherhood: Testimony of an Abortion Addict) is a memoir by Irene Vilar. It is the second memoir published by Vilar, the first being The Ladies’ Gallery.

== Controversy ==
Impossible Motherhood generated controversy on publication for the revelation that the author had 15 abortions in 17 years between the ages of 16 and 33. Vilar confesses to be an "abortion addiction" and argues that the abortions were an act of rebellion against her controlling husband who did not want any children. In the memoir she described how between the ninth abortion and tenth pregnancy she "needed another self-injury to get the high." Vilar also blamed American society for her actions, stating that women were expected to be perfect mothers but to also have professional achievements She states that she still holds pro-choice views, but admits that she feels she has abused the procedure in her past. The cycle of abortions began during a relationship with literary critic Pedro Cuperman. Vilar remarried in 2003 and now has two children.

== Reaction ==
The work angered American anti-abortion groups and Vilar received death threats and hate mail after publication. The work was rejected 51 times before publishers accepted it. Dr. Lauren Streicher, clinical assistant professor at the Northwestern University School of Medicine, suggested that Vilar could have mental health problems. The Sydney Morning Herald reports that pro-choice groups have been largely silent in response to the publication.

== See also ==
- Abortion debate
