= Milagros Benet de Mewton =

Puerto Rican teacher and suffragist

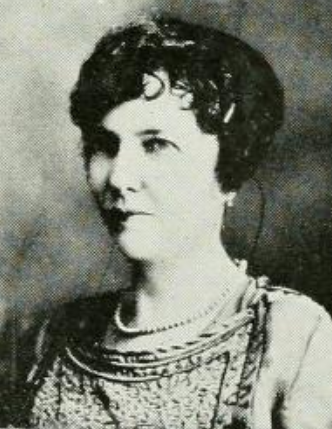
- Born: Milagros Benet Colón; 22 November 1868; Cayey, Captaincy General of Puerto Rico, Spanish Empire
- Died: 26 December 1948 (aged 80); Santurce, Puerto Rico
- Other name: Milagros Benet de Newton
- Occupations: teacher and suffragist
- Years active: 1901–1940
- Relatives: José Benet Colón (brother)

Milagros Benet de Mewton (née Benet Colón; 22 November 1868 – 26 December 1948) was a Puerto Rican educator, women's rights advocate and suffragist. Born into an intellectual, liberal family, Benet trained as a teacher. Inhabitants of the island gained U.S. citizenship in 1917, two decades after the United States acquired Puerto Rico from Spain in the Spanish–American War. Benet was active in the struggle for women's enfranchisement and joined the first suffragist organization Liga Femínea Puertorriqueña that year. When U.S. women gained the right to vote with the passage of the 19th Amendment in 1919, Benet led the push to extend its coverage to Puerto Rico. In 1924, she filed a lawsuit challenging the right of the electoral board to refuse to register women as they were U.S. citizens. The Supreme Court of Puerto Rico ruled that states and territories have the right to determine who can vote and denied her claim.

Benet continued pressing through the Liga Social Sufragista for the filing of various bills, which continued to be rejected by the insular legislature. In 1928, she pushed for the U.S. Congress to resolve the discrepancies in voting rights for women in Puerto Rico. Faced with the possibility that the federal legislature might give women the right to vote, the Puerto Rican legislature finally passed a law in 1929 granting suffrage to literate women. Universal suffrage, eliminating the educational restrictions, was gained in 1936. Benet is remembered for her work in education and for expanding women's rights in Puerto Rico.

== Early life ==
Milagros Benet Colón was born on 22 November 1868 (Note: Almost every document lists a different birth date for Benet. For example, her death record shows she was born in 1866; but, other records show 1890, 1887 and 1876. The 1910 census shows her sister Ulpiana de Gordils was older and her sister Cruz was younger than Milagros. Felix's death record lists eight children, besides Milagros: Ulpiana de Gordils (born 1866), Federíco (born 1871), José (born 1874), Luis (born 1876), Carmen (born 1880), Cruz (born 1882), and Rafael (born 1884). The dates would seem to confirm the 1868 date given in El Boricua is correct.) in Cayey in the Captaincy General of Puerto Rico of the Spanish Empire to Ulpiana Colón Collazo and Felix L. Benet Rivera. Her family was influential; both her father, who served as Secretary of the Provincial Council, and her brother José, who served in the House of Representatives, were politicians. Upon her father's death in 1898, Benet, her mother, and her younger sister Cruz went to live with her oldest sister Ulpiana de Gordils in the barrio Santurce in San Juan. It was also in 1898 that the United States acquired Puerto Rico from Spain at the conclusion of the Spanish–American War.

In 1901, both Benet and her younger sister Cruz earned their teaching certificates. Her sister became a nun but Benet went on to teach in the schools in Ponce, Puerto Rico. In 1911, she married Herbert Edwin Mewton (1873–1927) (Note: Mewton is sometimes shown as Albert Newton, or that name is given to his father, but a review of Puerto Rican documents written by Benet confirm the original name was Mewton.) who was from England.

== Activism ==
In 1917, Puerto Ricans gained U.S. citizenship and universal male suffrage. That year, the Puerto Rican Feminist League (Spanish: Liga Femínea Puertorriqueña) was founded by Ana Roqué. The Feminist League was active in trying to gain the right for women to vote. In 1919, when their local senator, Antonio Rafael Barceló, refused to discuss the matter, Benet, Isabel Andreu de Aguilar and María L. de Ashford traveled to Washington, D.C. to plead their case. Upon passage of the 19th Amendment, which granted the right to vote to U.S. women, the Bureau of Insular Affairs clarified to Governor Arthur Yager that its passage or ratification would not grant suffrage in Puerto Rico, because of the island's unincorporated status. In 1921, the Feminist League changed its name to the Suffragist Social League (Spanish: La Liga Social Sufragista), broadening its narrow focus on women's suffrage to demands for full civic and political participation for women. Benet served as the inaugural president of La Liga. That year, and subsequently in 1923, they submitted unsuccessful bills for women's enfranchisement to the insular legislature.

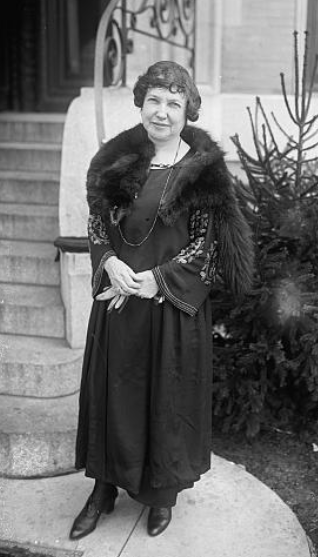
Benet in 1922

In 1922, Benet, along with one of the first women lawyers in Puerto Rico, Ana Teresa Paradas, attended the Pan-American Conference of Women, in Baltimore, Maryland which led to the formation of a permanent Pan-American Women's Association. While there, she spoke on working conditions for women in her homeland. In 1923, Benet became president of the Puerto Rican branch of the Pan-American Women's Association. Both she and Mariana Morales Bernard, a leader in the women's labor movement, filed court cases to assess the applicability of the 19th Amendment to Puerto Rico, as had been suggested by José Tous Soto, after the 1923 bill had been rejected in the Senate. Benet also sued the electoral registration board for refusing to allow her to register. Her case argued that as a U.S. citizen, she should be allowed to vote in accordance with the U.S. Constitution, because territorial law was not allowed to contravene U.S. law. The Supreme Court of Puerto Rico ruled that the electoral law was not discriminatory because Puerto Ricans were not allowed to vote for federal electors, and that the territory, like U.S. states, retained the right to define who was eligible to vote. Both cases were unsuccessful and they caused a rift in La Liga along political and social lines.

Fearing that an alliance with working-class women would promote the spread of socialism, under the leadership of president Rosario Bellber the conservative faction of La Liga resigned from the organization. These women formed a new organization, the Puerto Rican Association of Women's Suffrage (Spanish: Asociación Puertorriqueña de Mujeres Sufragistas), to work on suffrage exclusively for literate women. The liberal faction, many of whom were members of the Pure Republican Party (Spanish: Partido Republicano Puro), were led by Benet. New elections for La Liga were held among the remaining members who supported developing universal suffrage and maintaining the links of republicans and socialists. Marta Robert, a vice president of the Territorial Central Committee and a Republican, was elected president while Olivia Paoli de Braschi, a member of the Socialist Party (Spanish: Partido Socialista), was elected vice president. Among the other members who remained, besides Benet, were María Luisa Arcelay, Ángela Caldas de Miró, Carmen Gómez de Grosas, Ricarda López de Ramos Casellas, and Irene Fluxia de Thordsen.

Despite the coalition with socialists, Benet was cautious about the association. When delivering questionnaires for the Pan-American Women's Association to gather statistical information on Puerto Rican women, she was careful to drop off the forms and leave the Free Federation of Labor offices quickly so as not to attract the attention of those who might see her as an advocate of socialism. She also refused to meet with suffragists in 1928 in the shantytown of La Perla, preferring a more "suitable location" elsewhere in San Juan. In 1927, a lobbying campaign by La Liga pressed for a suffrage bill's passage in the insular legislature. The bill passed the Senate, but failed in the House. Benet responded by pressing for suffrage in Puerto Rico to be reviewed by the U.S. Congress in 1928. She was surprised to find that some U.S. women were opposed to the federal congress granting Puerto Rican women the vote. An amendment to the Jones–Shafroth Act proposed in the U. S. Senate did not make it out of the Senate committee and never reached a vote in the U.S. House. A similar bill, H.R. 7010, was introduced in the U.S. House and passed the House in December 1928. Though La Liga continued to press for universal suffrage, they acknowledged that they would support giving the franchise to literate women alone, as a stepping stone for full voting rights.

When it became apparent that the U.S. Congress was prepared to grant women's suffrage, the insular legislature approved a bill for literate women to vote on 16 April 1929. La Liga was the only suffragist organization that protested the measure and vowed to continue the fight until universal suffrage was granted; however, few further actions were taken by members of La Liga until it disbanded in the 1940s. Benet resigned her presidency in the Pan-American Women's Association in 1933, but continued activism on behalf of women and education. The following year, she was one of the intellectuals invited to assist in organizing the Puerto Rican Academy of History. Universal suffrage was finally gained in Puerto Rico in 1936, when a bill submitted by the Socialist Party the previous year, gained approval in the insular legislature. In 1938, she served as a delegate of the San Juan Teachers Union (Spanish: Unión de Maestros de San Juan) to an American Federation of Labor conference for teachers held in Cedar Point, Ohio. She attended the Pan American Conference in New York City in 1919 and was an honored guest of the Alliance of Pan American Round Tables conference in San Antonio, Texas.

== Death and legacy ==
Benet died on 26 December 1948 in the Hospital Pavia, Santurce, Puerto Rico. In her lifetime, she was honored by many women's groups from North and South America. She is remembered today for her activism in the fight for women's suffrage in Puerto Rico and an analysis of her life points to the impact she had upon gaining the right to vote. While working women like Luisa Capetillo, Juana Colón, and Genara Pagán de Arce fought for political rights, their struggle was focused around workers rights. They had little impact on the legal discussion of citizenship and as their organizational efforts focused on unionization and socialism, they were ineffective in organizing for broader appeal. When Benet, a member of the elite, filed her suit against the electoral board, she had the support of the liberal intellectual community, as well as a network of influential men who saw voting as an extension of democracy. The voting rights case she filed is still cited as a precedent for voting laws in the Commonwealth of Puerto Rico.
