= Jovita Idar =

American journalist, teacher, and activist (1885–1946)

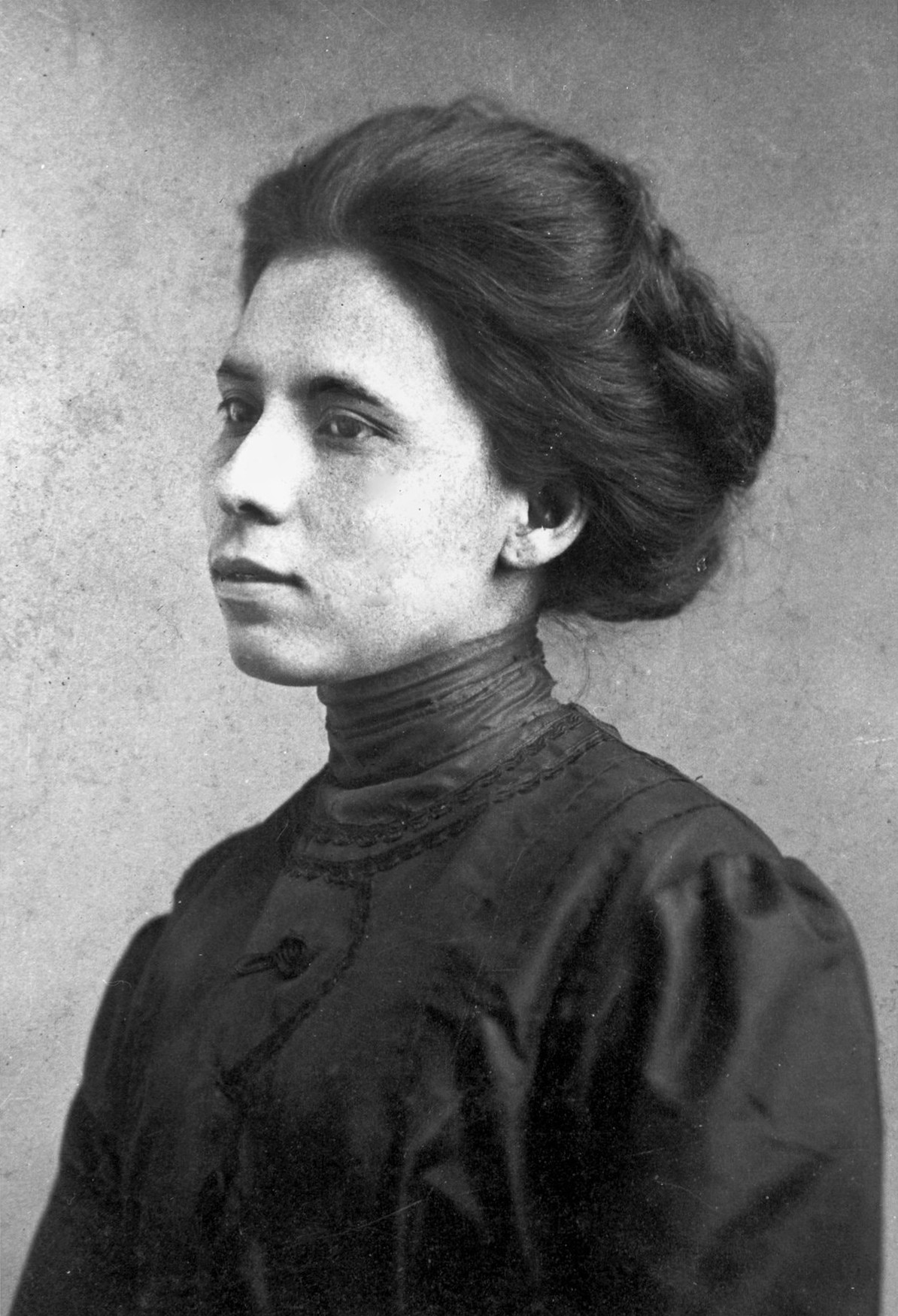
- Idar c. 1905
- Born: Jovita Idar Vivero; September 7, 1885; Laredo, Texas, U.S.
- Died: June 15, 1946 (aged 60); San Antonio, Texas, U.S.
- Occupations: Civil rights activist, journalist
- Organizations: Orden Caballeros de Honor; Liga Femenil Mexicanista; Primer Congreso Mexicanista
- Father: Peace N. Idar

Jovita Idar Vivero (September 7, 1885 – June 15, 1946) was an American journalist, teacher, political activist, and civil rights worker who championed the cause of Mexican Americans and Mexican immigrants. Against the backdrop of the Mexican Revolution, which lasted a decade from 1910 through 1920, she worked for a series of newspapers, using her writing to work towards making a meaningful and effective change. She began her career in journalism at La Crónica, her father's newspaper in Laredo, Texas, her hometown.

While working as a journalist, she became the president of the newly established League of Mexican Women—La Liga Femenil Mexicanista—in October 1911, an organization with a focus on offering free education to Mexican children in Laredo. She was also active in the Primer Congreso Mexicanista, an organization that brought Mexican-Americans together to discuss issues such as their lack of access to adequate education and economic resources.

Idar was honored on an American Women quarter in 2023.

== Early life ==
Jovita Idar was born in Laredo, Texas, in 1885. She was one of eight children of Jovita Vivero Gómez and Nicasio Idar who strove to advance the civil rights of Mexican-Americans. The Idar family were part of the gente decente, who had better access to good education and opportunities than many méxico-tejano families had. All eight Idar children grew up in an atmosphere where rights and responsibilities and the underprivileged circumstances of the Chicano community were consistently discussed. In the book Marching to a Different Drummer, Robin Kadison Berson explains that "Growing up, Jovita was an imaginative, spirited girl; eager student, she won prizes for her poetry and enjoyed reciting before an audience."

== Education and teaching ==
Idar earned her teaching certificate in 1903 from the Holding Institute in Laredo. She taught in a school in Los Ojuelos, located approximately 40 miles east of Laredo. The reality of her first years teaching was frustrating, "There were never enough textbooks for her pupils or enough paper, pens or pencils; if all her students came to class, there were not enough chairs or desks for them." The schooling for Chicano students was inadequate. Chicanos paid taxes to support decent schooling for their children yet they were denied entry to schools. Idar realized that her teaching efforts were making little impact on student lives due to the ill-equipped segregated schools.

== Advocacy for social issues ==
Against the backdrop of the Mexican Revolution, which lasted a decade from 1910 through 1920, Idar turned from teaching to journalism as a means of working towards making a meaningful and effective change. She returned to Laredo, Texas, where she began to work alongside two of her brothers, Eduardo and Clemente Idar, for her father's newspaper, La Crónica ("The Chronicle"). Their father, Nicasio Idar, was a strong and proud man, who advocated for civil rights and social justice for Mexican-Americans. He edited and published La Crónica, which became a major voice for Mexican and Tejano rights. Jovita wrote articles under a pseudonym, exposing the poor living-conditions of Mexican-American workers and supported the Revolution.

In 1910, La Crónica included articles on news, current events, biographical and historical essays that concerned Mexican Americans, literary essays and poetry, and commentary. It focused attention on the serious social and economic inequities experienced by Mexican Americans in Texas, in particular, and in the U.S., in general. It featured "stories on educational and social discrimination against Mexican Americans, poor economic conditions, decreasing use of the Spanish language, the loss of Mexican culture and the lynching of Hispanics."

In 1911, La Crónica established a "fraternal order", the Orden Caballeros de Honor to "discuss the troubling social issues at the time". and held the First Mexican Congress—the Primer Congreso Mexicano—dedicated to fighting inequality and racism, and to unite Mexicans on issues that affected them, including lack of access to adequate education and economic resources. While working at La Crónica, Idar also served as the first president of La Liga Femenil Mexicanista, the League of Mexican Women, an "offshoot" of the Congress that was founded in October 1911 in Laredo to offer free education to Mexican children. In her 2018 book based on her PhD dissertation, Redeeming La Raza: Transborder Modernity, Race, Respectability, and Rights, Gabriela González wrote that these organizations were established in response to the poverty and racism experienced by transborder Mexican communities.

While working at La Crónica, Idar also served as the first president of the League of Mexican Women (La Liga Femenil Mexicanista), an organization founded in October 1911 in Laredo to offer free education to Mexican children. Additional goals of the organization were to "unify the Mexican intellectuals of Texas around the issues of protection of civil rights, bilingual education, the lynching of Mexicans, labor organizing and women's concerns." The women within this league worked to transform these injustices into a plan of action and focused on relieving social problems through actively making changes within their communities. Women who participated in this organization were highly influential. "Some league members were trained educators and professionals, and the education of youth remained the organization's primary focus." It developed into a social, political and charitable organization for women that, in part, provided food and clothes to those in need.

Both the League of Mexican Women and the First Mexican Congress actively worked for the advancement of their members, "by holding studying and learning sessions, sessions where culture is acquired and talent is developed."

In March 1913, when Nuevo Laredo — on the Mexican side of the border — was attacked, Idar and other Laredo women crossed the Rio Grande River to volunteer to help with the wounded. While at the border, Idar later joined the La Cruz Blanca — the White Cross, an organization that provided relief similar to the Red Cross, that had been created and financed by Leonor Villegas de Magnón, who was also from Laredo.

In 1914, when she returned from her volunteer nursing work at the border, she began writing for El Progreso. An editorial published in El Progreso criticizing President Woodrow Wilson's order to dispatch U.S. military troops to the Mexico–United States border had offended the U.S. Army and Texas Rangers. The Rangers attempted to close El Progreso, but Idar blocked the entrance to the newspaper's office. When she was not at the newspaper's office one day, the Rangers returned to ransack it and to destroy the printing-presses, effectively shutting down the newspaper. Some historians say research suggests this story is a myth.

After her father's death in 1914, she became the editor and writer at La Crónica, where she continued to expose the conditions that Mexican-Americans and Mexican immigrants were living under at the time.

In November 1916, Idar founded the weekly paper Evolución which remained in operation until 1920.

Idar moved to San Antonio in 1921, where she founded a free kindergarten and also volunteered in a hospital as an interpreter.

In 1940, she co-edited the journal El Heraldo Cristiano.

== Personal life ==
In May 1917, Idar married Bartolo Juárez, who worked as a plumber and tinsmith. They lived together in San Antonio until her death, on June 15, 1946, which was reported to have been caused by a pulmonary hemorrhage. She had been suffering from advanced tuberculosis.

== Legacy ==
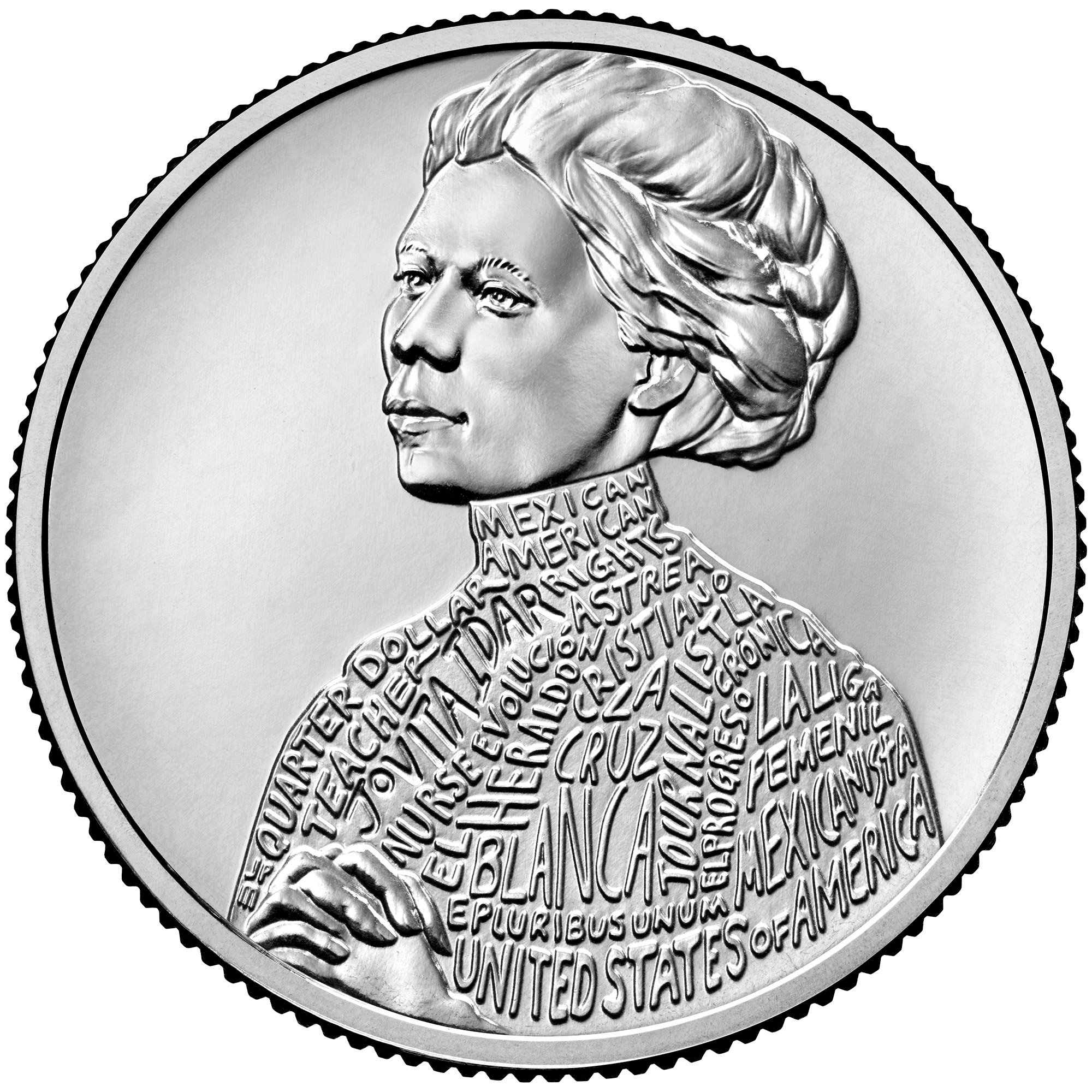
In 2023, Idar was included in the American Women quarters series.

In 2018, Gabriela González published her book Redeeming La Raza: Transborder Modernity, Race, Respectability, and Rights, which was based on her PhD dissertation in which she provided the historical, political, and socio-economic dimensions of la raza during Jovita Idar's lifetime, including an in-depth description of the role Idar's family played over several generations.

Profiles of Idar have been included in the National Women's History Museum, the Women in Texas History series, the 2005 edition of The Oxford Encyclopedia of Latinos and Latinas in the United States, and in the series Texas Originals. Her story was included in Laura Gutierrez-Witt's chapter "Cultural Continuity in the Face of Change: Hispanic Printers in Texas" in the 1996 publication Recovering the U.S. Hispanic Literary Heritage.

In the chapter entitled "Jovita Idar: The Ideological Origins of a Transnational Advocate" for La Raza in the 2015 publication Texas Women: Their Histories, Their Lives, the authors wrote that Idar promoted the values of the "gente decente," self-identified decent, honest and respectable people, as the solution to the social problems faced by marginalized communities, "Idar promoted the idea that education elevated women and by extension men." She reflected an ideal of feminism that was not completely against Victorian concepts, but she did challenge ideas and break boundaries of the patriarchal society of her time. The New York Times included Idar in a series of obituaries called Overlooked, about people whose accomplishments in their lifetime deserved to be acknowledged in the media when they died but were not. In their August 2020 installment, the focus was on the centennial of the Nineteenth Amendment to the United States Constitution, which was adopted in 1920. The 19th Amendment prohibits any American citizen from being denied the right to vote on the basis of sex.

As part of Hispanic Heritage Month, the Google Doodle on September 21, 2020, paid homage to Idar by depicting her famous blockade of the offices of El Progreso against the Texas Rangers and commemorating via hover box her 135th birthday (two weeks after her actual birthday).

Idar was honored on an American Women quarter in 2023.
