= Leonor Villegas de Magnón =

Mexican-American political activist

- Born: Leonor Villegas; June 12, 1876; Nuevo Laredo, Mexico
- Died: April 17, 1955 (aged 78); Mexico City, Mexico

Leonor Villegas de Magnón (June 12, 1876 – April 17, 1955) was a Mexican-American political activist, teacher, and journalist who founded a brigade of the international Mexican American relief service, La Cruz Blanca (the White Cross), during the Mexican Revolution.

As a Mexican Revolution leader, Magnón documented her experiences as well as the contributions of many women and revolutionary leaders in her autobiography, La Rebelde (The Rebel).

== Personal life ==
Leonor Villegas de Magnón was born in Nuevo Laredo, a town close to the U.S.-Mexico border. Magnon and her family eventually moved to the United States to escape the fighting in Mexico.

Magnón’s family was fairly wealthy because her father, Joaquin Villegas, was a businessman involved in ranching, mining, and the import-export business. It is her father who gave Magnón the nickname, La Rebelde, at the very beginning of her autobiography. After the death of her mother, Valerianna Rubio, Magnón’s father remarried and Magnón was subsequently sent to various boarding schools in the United States. By 1895, Magnón had received her bachelor's and teaching certificate at New York's Academy of Mount St. Ursula. She married Aldopho Magnón, an American Citizen in 1901. They settled in Mexico City to teach kindergarten out of their home. The couple had three children. Magnón also began to write articles criticizing then Mexican dictator Porfirio Díaz in La Crónica, a Spanish-language newspaper founded by the Idar family (of Jovita Idar) that exposed injustices against the community.

After her father's death in 1910, Magnón was not allowed to visit her father in Mexico for a proper burial due to the war.

== Career ==
Because of Magnón's political affiliation her dad's businesses in Mexico began to be shut down, and Magnón fled to Laredo, Texas, while her husband stayed in Mexico. Magnón taught kindergarten in Mexico City and Laredo, Texas. After the Mexican Revolution ended, she founded the first bilingual school for kindergarteners in Laredo. Being politically active, Magnón wrote for the newspapers, El Progreso, La Cronica, y El Radical, criticizing Porfirio Díaz and demonstrating support for Francisco Madero. Magnón wrote in these newspapers under her maiden name, Villegas.

== La Cruz Blanca (The White Cross) ==
Magnón founded, organized, and led the nursing corps known as La Cruz Blanca, or The White Cross, in 1914. This corps of men and women provided medical aid to the soldiers from Carranza’s Constitutionalist Army. The White Cross formed in the borderlands between the U.S. and Mexico, in Laredo, as a response to the already established National Red Cross’ partiality toward the Federals. As leader of this organization, Magnón was a prominent figure during the Mexican Revolution, some comparing her role to that of a general. After the revolution, Magnón’s efforts were recognized, and the post-revolutionary government awarded her five different medals. Despite this, Magnón’s and the role of women during the revolution went largely ignored if not actively erased from the official history.

When Nuevo Laredo was attacked in March 1913, Magnón, alongside other Laredo women marched across the Rio Grande to aid the wounded. To assure a more organized assistance, Leonor formed and financed La Cruz Blanca, The White Cross. When Nuevo Laredo was attacked again on January 1, 1914, Magnón eventually transformed her home, garage, and school into a makeshift hospital for her all-volunteer medical team, La Cruz Blanca. More than 100 of Constitutionalist soldiers were treated in her home that month. When American army officials were stationed outside the makeshift hospital to arrest the Mexican soldier-patients, Magnón organized several ways to help soldiers escape as soon as they were well enough. When fifty soldiers were arrested and taken from the makeshift hospital, Magnón hired an attorney to free the men. She was unsuccessful but eventually the Secretary of State would release the soldiers.

For Magnón, The White Cross was a symbol of integrity and patriotism for the Mexican people and envisioned it expanding and continuing even after the revolution. During and after the revolution, Magnón actively documented her activities regarding The White Cross among other things. The most notable example is her book, La Rebelde (The Rebel), but she also saved many photographs and documents from the revolution which was eventually passed down to her granddaughter. The US Hispanic Literary Heritage Project from University of Houston recovered these artifacts in 1994 and 2007. Her book as well as photographs demonstrate that she was in close contact with leaders of the Constitutionalist Army, including Venustiano Carranza himself, further evidencing her significant role as a revolution leader.

== La Rebelde (The Rebel) ==
Magnón wrote about her participation in the Mexican Revolution in her autobiography, La Rebelde (The Rebel). This dramatized account of Magnón’s life reveals much about her operation of La Cruz Blanca as well as networks of female spies. Clara Lomas, in her preface to The Rebel, writes about the importance of preserving a novel that self-documents the contributions of women during the Revolution, citing the second version of her autobiography all in English which was also rejected by American publishers. Up until the year of her death, Magnon made 26 attempts to publish her book. It was only in 1994, thirty-nine years after Magnón’s death, that her granddaughter, Leonor Smith, was able to publish her grandmother’s novel through Arte Público Press.

Despite the novel being autobiographical, Magnón writes in third person and refers to herself by the titular epithet, “The Rebel.” Currently, The Rebel contains a preface and introduction by Clara Lomas, nineteen chapters, and five appendices. One of the appendices contains a list of names and brief, detailed descriptions of the historical characters that appear in The Rebel. Magnon begins the novel with her birth and ends with Venustiano Carranza’s death.

== Death and legacy ==
Leonor Villegas de Magnón died in Mexico City on April 17, 1955, at the age of 78. In recognition of Magnón's work, a monument was erected in Nuevo Laredo in 2010, ninety years after the end of the Mexican Revolution.
