= Marilyn Batista Márquez =

Puerto Rican writer

- Born: 1959 (age 65–66); Bayamón, Puerto Rico
- Occupation(s): Writer, journalist

Marilyn Batista Márquez (Bayamón, Puerto Rico, 1959) is a writer, journalist, and women’s rights advocate. Since 1990, she has lived in Costa Rica, and since 2020 she has divided her time between that country and Florida.

== Biography ==
Marilyn Batista was born in Bayamón, Puerto Rico. She arrived in Costa Rica in 1990 and became a professor of news journalism at the University of Costa Rica. Throughout her career, she has worked as a journalist for El Nuevo Día in Puerto Rico, and in Costa Rica she distinguished herself as director of La Prensa Libre, at that time the oldest newspaper in Central America. She writes regularly for La República on topics related to the economy and the defense of human rights, promoting equality and equity.

She held a prominent leadership role in the Costa Rican Chamber of Commerce as president of the Women in Business Program, where she fought for gender parity, achieving the organization’s first gender-balanced Board of Directors in 2016. She also served as the executive director of the College of Journalists and Communication Professionals.

In 2015, she founded Revista Petra, a publication dedicated to enhancing women’s visibility and advancement through education and action.

== Literary work ==
Her first book, Cuentos de Petra, was published in 2012. It brings together twelve stories in which, according to Rónald Rivera Rivera, professor of Literature at the University of Costa Rica, “there is a feminine intentionality to articulate her own counter-discourse to the dominant discourse of the other.” Several of the stories in this collection were adapted into monologues and presented in various cultural venues in Costa Rica.

In 2019, she published her second collection of short stories, Sangre de toro, moving somewhat away from the erotic theme to expose the harsh reality faced by women across different sectors of society, where they must confront aggression, machismo, or prostitution, while maintaining the tragicomic style that has become her hallmark. Sangre de toro debuted at the International Book Fair in May of that year.

In 2022, Marilyn Batista published her first poetry collection, Insurrección, followed in 2023 by Hembras. Regarding Insurrección, Elizabeth Odio Benito, former president of the Inter-American Court of Human Rights, commented: “From Sor Juana Inés and Alfonsina Storni, and from women poets like them, persist the echoes that still resonate today. From that poetry written to sting the soul, to open the eyes, to protest, to call for insurrection, comes this collection of poems by Marilyn Batista. Reading it strikes and hurts, but it also compels us to gather the courage needed for the struggle and the insurrection that will put an end, once and for all, to the injustice and horror endured by thousands of women.”

In the prologue to Hembras, Rodrigo Quesada Monge wrote: “With this new poetry collection, the author reveals a series of insights into the female condition through bold poems that dare to take a step forward within traditional Costa Rican literature. After Grace Prada, Yolanda Oreamuno, Eunice Odio, and Yadira Calvo, there seemed to be little left to say that was new or compelling. But the emergence of Marilyn Batista brings innovative and imaginative perspectives to a field of poetry that had appeared to be nearing exhaustion.”

== Recognition ==
In 2013, as director of La Prensa Libre, the newspaper received an award from the Costa Rican College of Journalists for its collective efforts in defending freedom of the press in the country.

As a columnist, she has distinguished herself in topics promoting gender equality and equity, and in 2019 she received the Medal for the Defense of Communication, Human Rights, and Culture, awarded by the Costa Rican College of Journalists and Communication Professionals “for her career in communication, her advocacy for gender equality and equity, and her support of the visual arts in our country.”

In November 2020, Revista Petra, the digital outlet founded by Marilyn Batista, won the Carmen Cornejo Méndez Award for Best Alternative Media, granted by the Costa Rican College of Journalists and Communication Professionals (COLPER), which annually recognizes the quality and efforts of communicators in Costa Rica.

== Works ==
- Cuentos de Petra (short stories, 2012)
- Sangre de Toro (short stories, 2019)
- Insurrección (poetry/short prose, 2022)
- Hembras (poetry, 2023)
- Sin pecado concebida (short stories, 2025)
