= The Ladies' Gallery: A Memoir of Family Secrets =

Book by Irene Vilar

- Author: Irene Vilar
- Original title: A Message From God in the Atomic Age
- Language: English
- Genre: Memoir
- Publisher: Pantheon Books (1996); Vintage (1998)
- Publication date: 1996
- ISBN: 978-0-679-74546-4

The Ladies’ Gallery is a memoir that tells the stories of three women: the author Irene Vilar, her mother Gladys Méndez, and her grandmother the Puerto Rican independence activist Lolita Lebrón. The memoir was translated from the Spanish by Gregory Rabassa and has only been published in English. It was first published by Pantheon Books in 1996 as A Message From God in the Atomic Age and then by Vintage in 1998 as The Ladies’ Gallery: A Memoir of Family Secrets. The work was nominated for the 1999 Mind Book of the Year Award.

== Author ==
Irene Vilar was born in 1969 in Puerto Rico, where she spent much of her childhood. She also attended schools in the United States and Spain before enrolling in Syracuse University in New York at the age of fifteen. Vilar has also co-authored a children's book titled Sea Journal. She currently works as an author, editor, and literary agent. For biographical and professional information, see irenevilar.com

== Summary ==
Vilar's narrative is circular and framed by her description of the time she spent in psychiatric hospitals following two attempted suicide attempts while a college student. Vilar grew up in Puerto Rico with her parents and three older brothers. Her mother, Gladys Méndez, committed suicide by jumping out of a moving car while eight-year-old Irene was sitting next to her. Vilar mourned her mother's death and decided to attend school in the United States, where her aunt and uncle were working, and then in Spain, in the town where her paternal grandfather fled around the time of the Spanish Civil War. As a college student in Syracuse, Vilar attempted suicide twice and spent time psychiatric wards.

Gladys's own mother, Lolita, had left Puerto Rico for the United States to look for work during the mid-twentieth century, leaving her as an infant to be raised by her grandparents. Gladys only met Lolita once when she was eight and Lolita came to leave a son in Puerto Rico, and three more times while Lolita was imprisoned. At fifteen, Gladys married a man who was frequently unfaithful and the couple had dramatic fights and reconciliations. She became increasingly despondent and physically ill towards the end of her life.

Lolita Lebrón, Vilar's grandmother, led an armed attack on the United States House of Representatives on March 1, 1954, inspired by Puerto Rican nationalist leader Pedro Albizu Campos. She, along with three male counterparts, sat in the visitor's area called “The Ladies’ Gallery” and opened fire in the chamber. Several congressmen were hurt, but no one was killed. Due to a recent attack on President Truman's temporary residence, the nationalist activists were expecting to be killed themselves. Lolita was sentenced to fifty-seven years in prison, of which she served twenty-seven until being pardoned by President Carter.

In addition to the women's stories as imagined by Vilar, the memoir includes historical information, interview segments, and reflections on issues from cultural identity to literature. The memoir concludes with Vilar's release from the hospital and miscarriage, along with an epilogue and note.

== Some themes ==
- Repetition: The memoir revolves around themes of repetition. Vilar says, “Repetition informs my life” (Vilar 4). In this memoir, patterns are repeated generation after generation.
- Abandonment: “Someone goes and someone stays” (Vilar 66). Whether through migration or suicide, abandonment and its aftermath are key issues in this text.
- Motherhood: By focusing on three generations of women, all of whom experience unplanned and/or unwanted pregnancy, this memoir explores the complexity of motherhood. Vilar says, “A missing mother—and one of whom not even her photographs remain—is a problem” (Vilar 29).
- Identity: This memoir explores the legacy of violence and history, both personal and political, in the individual's life. It also examines the relationship between the United States and Puerto Rico and what this means for the identity of those with Puerto Rican origins.

== Readings and interviews ==
- Vilar reading an excerpt of The Ladies' Gallery on WGBH Boston .
- Transcript of Ilan Stavans's interview with Vilar on WGBH Boston's La Plaza program .

== Reviews and related articles ==
- Ojito, Mirta. “Shots That Haunted 3 Generations.” The New York Times 26 May 1998.
- Pérez Ortiz, Melanie A. “Irene Vilar: Critique of Self-Sacrifice in the Puerto Rican Nationalist Party From the Forbidden Side of the Border." Encrucijadas/Crossroads 1.1 (2003): 99-116.
- Roig-Franzia, Manuel. "A Terrorist in the House." The Washington Post Magazine. 22 February 2004. Full text also available at .
- For a list of reviews of The Ladies' Gallery, see www.publishersmarketplace.com.

== See also ==
- Impossible Motherhood
