= Network of Hispanic Communicators =

Organisation

The Dallas/Fort Worth Network of Hispanic Communicators or Hispanic Communicators - DFW is an organization composed of working print and broadcast journalists, public relations professionals and members of the media community. The organization was founded in 1981 and has been influential in the shaping of the National Association of Hispanic Journalists and other journalism organizations in North Texas.

The nonprofit, non-partisan organization serves as a professional support and advocacy association for professional communicators in the DFW area. NHC is affiliated with the National Association of Hispanic Journalists and is now an official DFW chapter of the organization.

The mission of the organization is to nurture—through mentoring and scholarships—young Hispanics interested in entering the field of communications. The group also strives to further the employment and career opportunities of Hispanics in the news media, and provide a forum for issues important to the Hispanic community.
