= La Cruz Blanca =

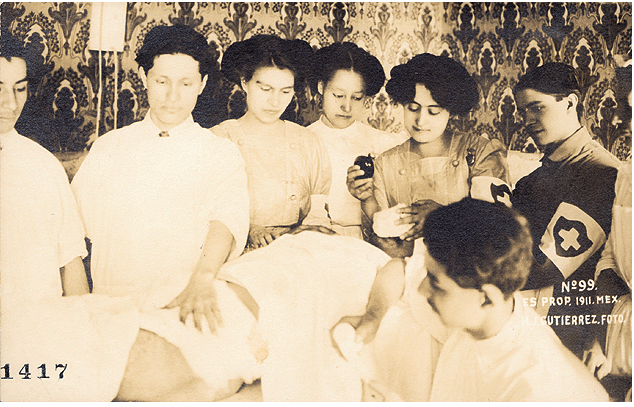
Elena Arizmendi and volunteers of the Neutral White Cross, 1911

La Cruz Blanca Neutral (The Neutral White Cross) was a volunteer infirmary and relief service established during the Mexican Revolution to care for those wounded in the conflict. The Red Cross refused to treat insurgents and the Neutral White Cross was developed to treat all combatants. After their initial success in Ciudad Juárez, the organization spread out through 25 states in Mexico for the duration of the war. It continued as a quasi-governmentally subsidized organization into the 1940s, when it was converted into an organization to assist children. The organization is still operating in Mexico City.

== Formation ==
La Cruz Blanca Neutral was a volunteer infirmary and relief service founded by Elena Arizmendi Mejia in 1911. She was enrolled at the School of Nursing of the Santa Rosa Hospital (now the School of Nursing at the University of the Incarnate Word) in San Antonio, Texas when the war broke out. Her school was next door to the Texas residence of her family friend whom she supported, Francisco I. Madero, who challenged Porfirio Díaz for the presidency in 1910, was jailed by Díaz but escaped and fled to Texas. Reports of the war, casualties and the refusal of the Red Cross to treat insurgents, caused Arizmendi to return to Mexico City via train on 17 April 1911. Once there, she arranged a personal meeting with the head of the Red Cross organisation. When the director reiterated that they would not treat revolutionaries, Arizmendi decided to found an organisation that would treat her countrymen. She and her brother, Carlos, rallied medical students and nurses to the cause.

They formed an association under the guidelines of the Geneva Conventions and she acted as fundraiser, enlisting the help of celebrities like María Conesa, Virginia Fábregas, and Leopoldo Beristáin. After numerous fundraising events, they had collected sufficient funds for a field hospital and on 11 May 1911, set off for Ciudad Juárez. Arizmendi and Carlos, formed the first brigade with Dr. Ignacio Barrios and Dr. Antonio Márquez and nurses María Avon, Juana Flores Gallardo, Atilana García, Elena de Lange, and Tomasa Villareal. The second brigade, led by Dr. Francisco, left the following day and on the 14th a third brigade, headed by Dr. Lorenzo and ten nurses including Innocenta Díaz, Concepción Ibáñez, Jovita Muñiz, Concepción Sánchez, María Sánchez, Basilia Vélez, María Vélez and Antonia Zorilla, set off for Juárez. Arriving in the city, they found devastation and again Arizmendi had to rally for funds.

== Ciudad de Juárez ==
Utilising buildings and supplies secured from the rebels at the Hospital de Jesús, Hospital Juárez, and the medical student dormitories and pharmacies, the brigades swiftly set to work. American medics from nearby El Paso, Texas formed the Hospital Insurrecto (Insurgent's Hospital) near the border. The devastation of the city and so many wounded strained the supplies and Arizmendi again rallied for funding.

A homeopathic doctor, Laglera, established Hospital Libertad (Liberty Hospital) to deal with wounded and typhus patients. He was assisted by nurses Rebeca Guillén, and the Vélez sisters and Zorilla who had come in the 3rd brigade. Nurses Rhoda Miller, Francés M. Readi, Teodora J. Velarde and Tomasa Villareal from the first brigade formed the surgical nurse team. There were twenty nurses assigned to work in the City of Juarez: María Avon, Innocenta Díaz, Juana Flores Gallardo, Atilana García, Rebeca Guillén, Concepción Ibáñez, Elena de Lange, Rhoda Miller, Jovita Muñiz, Telésfora Pérez, Francés M. Readi, Amelia Rodríguez, Concepción Sánchez, María Sánchez, Teodora J. Velarde, Basilia Vélez, María Vélez, Loreto Vélez, Tomasa Villarreal y Antonia Zorilla. In the 11th and 4th infirmary, at the Insurgent's Hospital were Tomasita F. de Aguirre, Esther Concha, Josefina Espalin, Guadalupe G. Vda. de Gameros, María Gaskey, Libradita Leyva, Bernardina S. de Leyva, Máxima de Martínez, Juanita Nápoles, Anita L. Robert and Adela Vásquez Schiaffino, who was a journalist.

The brigade traveling with Madero included Manuel Realivásquez, Juan Anaya, Silvano N. Córdova, José María Delgado, and Dick Brown. Finally the nurses who made rounds for those who refused to go to hospitals included Guadalupe G. Vda. de Gameros, Señora Salazar de Harry, Laura Nájera de Morgan y Belem G. de Realivásquez.

== Expansion through Mexico ==
On 7 June 1911 a massive earthquake struck Mexico and the members of the White Cross rushed to the epicenter in Iguala, Guerrero to offer assistance. By the end of 1911, the Neutral White Cross had established 25 brigades across Mexico. Arzimendi was elected as the first woman partner of the Sociedad Mexicana de Geografía y Estadística, but she rejected the honour. She did accept a gold medal presented to her for dedication with helping the wounded by the Gran Liga Obrera (Grand League of Obrera). Ironically, in 1912, the Swiss Confederation of the International Red Cross presented Silver Medals to the nurses who had served in Chihuahua, Guerrero and Morelos with the White Cross. In 1913, factionalism between male doctors who did not want to follow orders from a woman, split those supporting Arizmendi and those supporting Dr. Marquez into opposing camps. Arizmendi consulted a young attorney, José Vasconcelos, who would later become Mexico's Secretary of Education. Arizmendi withdrew and moved to New York City.

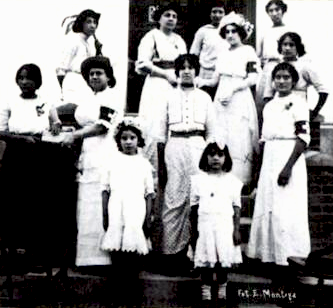
Leonor Villegas de Magnón (in white hat) with La Cruz Blanca, circa 1914. Photo by Esuebio Montoya

A later brigade was founded by Leonor Villegas de Magnón in 1913 that aided soldiers along both sides of the Texas-Mexican border near Laredo, Texas. A close-knit group of women and American doctors who helped the wounded during fighting, treated the wounded in Magnón's home, which had already been a makeshift kindergarten classroom. Magnón considered the preservation of Latino history important, and therefore had a "semi-official" photographer for Cruz Blanca, Esuebio Montoya. She made it understood that selling negatives or pictures was out of the question. In further strides to preserve the history of Cruz Blanca, Magnón wrote The Rebel, a third-person memoir and account of the activities of Cruz Blanca. Unfortunately her manuscript was not published in her lifetime for many reasons, one of them including unconventional gender roles. It was not until 1994 when Arte Publico Press would pick up the manuscript from her granddaughter.

== Current organisation ==
In 1948, Arizmendi changed the direction of the White Cross, due to governmental indifference. Since 1942, the only funding had come from the benefactor, Rodulfo Brito Foucher. The White Cross, still exists in Coyoacán one of the neighborhoods of Mexico City. The institution is dedicated to the care and rehabilitation of children with severe malnutrition problems.

== See also ==
- Jovita Idar
- Mexican Revolution
- María Arias Bernal
