= Vionette Negretti =

Puerto Rican journalist

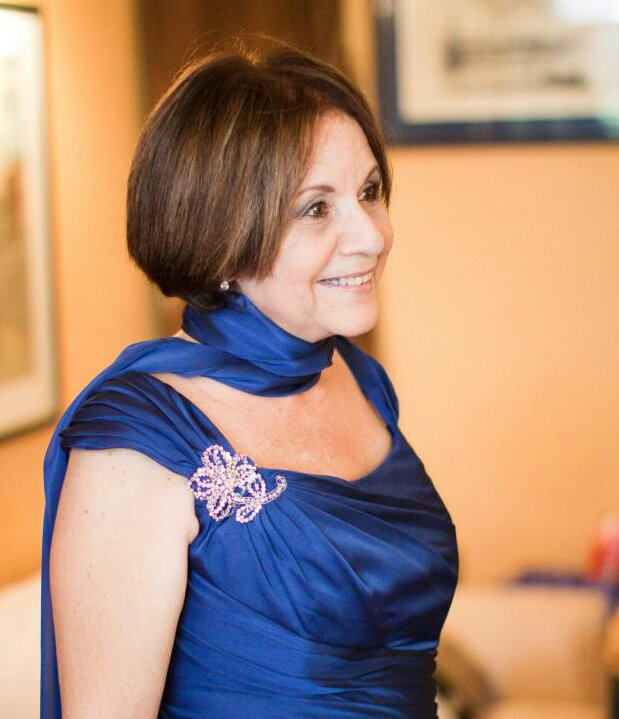
Wikipedia - Foto

Vionette Giovanna Negretti is a Puerto Rican journalist and writer who, between 1976 and 2008, worked as reporter for several newspapers as well as in radio and television stations in San Juan and became co-anchor of a televised newscast. Negretti has also worked as communications and press aide to Puerto Rico's House Speaker and for a Senator from San Juan and is often invited by educational institutions to give lectures regarding her literary work.

== Early years ==
Negretti was born in San Juan, Puerto Rico Her paternal family is of Italian origin due to the 1904 arrival in San Juan of her grandfather Giovanni Negretti-Odescalchi, an architect and engineer born and raised in Como (Lombardy,) who had recently graduated from Sorbonne University in Paris and had been hired by the Porto Rico Railroad Company to oversee the expansion of the railway and design the railroad system's stations. He took up residence in Old San Juan after becoming the vice president of the company and marrying Puerto Rican Emilia Santisteban. Negretti's maternal family is of French extraction due to the 1900 arrival in Puerto Rico of her great grandfather, businessman Gustave Emile Lavergne, who emigrated from the city of Nantes (France) and who after marrying Naguabo native Emilia Gómez-Vargas, established residence in Vieques (an island-municipality of Puerto Rico.)

After Negretti's father, Gino P. Negretti, graduated from Law School, he established his practice in Miami (USA) in 1951, wherefore Negretti became bilingual at an early age. Upon her return to San Juan after her parents' divorce in 1954, the family – her mother Fe Josefina Lavergne, who worked for decades in the insurance business in San Juan and her brother Gino – established their residence in San Juan's suburban area of Hato Rey, where Negretti attended Colegio Espíritu Santo (a Catholic educational center) until the eighth grade. She was then enrolled at University High School in nearby Río Piedras, where during three consecutive years she was the editor of the school's newspaper, Campus UHS.

During those years she was introduced to the world of arts and literature by her paternal uncle, Boris Negretti, who often took her to his friends’ literary circle meetings, to the theatre and to museum and art gallery exhibitions in San Juan as well as providing her with many contemporary works of literature. Also contributing to her love of literature was her high school Spanish teacher, Dr. Carmen Turull-García, who constantly persuaded her to write. Negretti spent summers with her father in Miami, where he hired her as a legal assistant, an opportunity that allowed her to acquire basic legal knowledge that she put to use when she became a news reporter.

At the time she attended the University of Puerto Rico the institution did not have a School of Journalism and she enrolled as a student in the Humanities Department, which provided students with the opportunity of taking a series of classes offered by veteran journalists, among them professor José Pirulo Hernández, who due to the fact that many of his students became renowned news reporters, editorialists, columnists and writers, was known as the Educator of Journalists.

== Journalism ==
In 1978 professor Hernández recommended Negretti, who was living with her husband and children in Florida, for an internship at the newspapers Hialeah Home News y Miami Springs News, both owned by Elmer Rounds, a veteran Associated Press journalist who had gained fame after working as news correspondent for the news agency during the Cuban Revolution and the crisis in Nicaragua. After completing her internship, Rounds offered Negretti a job as editor-in-chief of the new 10-page Spanish section of the Hialeah Home News, which allowed her to gain knowledge of all the phases of news publishing.

Upon her return to Puerto Rico, Negretti was hired by Luis Villares, editor-in-chief of the San Juan- based newspaper El Mundo as copy editor and later as news reporter, which allowed her to learn ‘the tricks of news reporting that can only be acquired by working a beat’ under the wings of renown Puerto Rican journalists such as Malén Rojas Daporta, Luis Romero Cuevas, Juan Tato Ramos and Luis Cabán. Her most memorable report while working for El Mundo was a two-part front-page article in which the residents and the mayor of Vieques, as well as the staff of the island-municipality's only medical facility decried the poor state of affairs at the center. The article prompted the government to eventually revamp the existing medical facilities while the construction of a new one took place.

Negretti's incursion in radio news programs was due to her recruitment as producer of news programs by Victelio Martínez, news director at WQII, Noticias 1140, (Guaynabo, Puerto Rico,) Three months after accepting the job she became a news reporter for the station and among the stories she covered was the situation endured by 800 Haitians detained at Fort Allen, a military base in Juana Díaz (Puerto Rico) after the U.S. Immigration Office signed a contract with the Puerto Rican government that allowed the agency's use of the military facility for the detention of refugees. Negretti was the first news reporter to gain entrance to the base and interview several detainees, after which she reported a series of human rights violations at the center that impacted the Puerto Rican public as well as the international community, which in turn generated the visit of Nobel Peace Prize winner, Argentinian Adolfo Pérez Esquivel to the detention center.

In 1984 Negretti was recruited by news director Ramón Cotta as a reporter for Eyewitness News, a newscast transmitted in English by WPRV-TV Channel 13, the ABC (American Broadcasting System) affiliate in San Juan. In a short span of time she was assigned to cover the political beat, which meant her daily work entailed the coverage of the governor, the State Department and the Capitol. After working six months at the station, she became co-anchor of the evening newscast along with Christopher Crommett, a renowned journalist who later became the director of CNN Español (CNN in Spanish) in Atlanta, Georgia.

Within the year Negretti was awarded an Agueybaná award by the Higher Council of Arts of Puerto Rico) for Paradise Lost, an investigative report on criminality in the form of a documentary for which she became a jack-of-all-trades by undertaking the investigative work, writing the script and also producing it. This documentary was used by Francisco Aponte-Pérez, a former senator and a University of Puerto Rico's Law School professor as a learning tool in his classes.

Later on Negretti was handed two INTRE (acronym in Spanish for Radio and Television Ethics Institute) awards for excellence in the coverage of political news and for her television coverage of the murder trial against Puerto Rican actress Lydia Echevarría. Her reports on the so-called Mameyes Disaster (1985,) the landslide of a hill near the city of Ponce that caused the death of more than 100 people and the New Year's Eve DuPont Plaza Hotel fire in San Juan (1986,) in which 97 people lost their lives and 140 others were injured, gained her two awards issued by the Senate of Puerto Rico.

Negretti's exclusive interview of the wife of Héctor Escudero-Aponte, a DuPont Plaza Hotel employee and Teamsters union member who was found guilty of starting the fire at the hotel, was published in the front page of The New York Times and her daily televised reports of the aftermath of the fire and the government investigation of the catastrophe were transmitted by all ABC affiliates throughout the United States.

Her exclusive report on the alleged illegal appropriation of Puerto Rican patrimony by a prominent American treasure hunter, released shortly before the latter was supposedly about to depart Puerto Rico with several gold ingots found in a Spanish galleon that had sunk in waters of Vieques during the 17th Century, generated a joint investigation by the Puerto Rico legislature and the filing of a law to protect the island's national patrimony. Another of her exclusive reports was able to generate enough public pressure to force the government to maintain free access, as dictated by law, to Las Picúas Beach in Río Grande in order to allow local fishermen to regain direct access to their boats and be able to work.

The vice president of Puerto Rico's Journalists Association, Carmen Rita Pérez, recruited Negretti in 1987 to conduct Frente al pueblo (In front of the people,) a televised program produced by the association and in which the moderator steered the discussion of important issues by high-profile personalities. Transmitted on a weekly basis by WIPR-TV, Canal 6 (San Juan,) the program increased its ratings during the year Negretti served as moderator.

After the closure of WPRV-TV, Negretti was recruited by House Speaker José Ronaldo “Rony” Jarabo as press, communications and public relations aide. She later worked for the San Juan-based daily The San Juan Star, where she was a member of the editing staff and then as a reporter for the newspaper's magazine Weekend. During that time, Negretti held an exclusive interview with famed Puerto Rican musician and band leader Tito Puente that was published as a two-page spread that is still used as reference by many institutions and individuals.

While working for The San Juan Star she was recruited by El Oriental newspaper in Humacao (Puerto Rico,) owned by Pierantoni Enterprises, to be editor-in-chief of a special 200-page edition of the newspaper commemorating the 200th anniversary of the founding of the city of Humacao (1993.) A copy of that edition was placed inside a vacuum-sealed container and buried under the monument dedicated to Taíno chief Jumacao, located in the outskirts of the city. The container will be opened in 2093.

Negretti also worked as senior copywriter with Better Communications Group, an advertising agency located in Guaynabo, Puerto Rico, as press, communications and public relations officer for Technical and Scientific Services, located in Río Piedras and directed by chemist and renowned environmentalist Neftalí García, and as press, communications and public relations aide to San Juan senator José Ortiz Daliot.

While she worked for Ortiz Daliot, Negretti organized the First Symposium on Autism, the first activity of this type held anywhere, which was held in Ponce (Puerto Rico.) As a result, she represented the Senate of Puerto Rico at a three-day symposium on autism held by the United States Department of Health and Human Services in Washington, D.C., where she was one of the main speakers.

== Literary works ==
La buenaventura

The publication of La buenaventura in 2005 caused a great uproar within the Catholic Church in Puerto Rico due to its contents. An investigative report written as a narrative, the first part of the book is based on the memoirs of a Puerto Rican peasant describing an alleged 10-year-long Marian apparition at La Santa Montaña de Puerto Rico (The Sacred Mountain of Puerto Rico) located in the municipality of San Lorenzo. The second part of the book deals with an alleged conspiracy between several of the island's priests and high-ranking church authorities to oust the bishop of the Diocese of Caguas, Monsignor Enrique Hernández, by using the results of the investigation of the events at La Santa Montaña ordered by the prelate as spearhead in what turned out to be an alleged full-fledged war against him.

La buenaventura (The good venture) soon became a bestseller at the three Borders bookstores in Puerto Rico and remained on its top-10 bestseller list for eight months between 2005 and 2006.

Tiempos revueltos

Tiempos revueltos, published in 2008, is a historical novel which narrates in detail El Grito de Jayuya, (The Outcry at Jayuya) the Nationalist revolution that took place in Puerto Rico in 1950 against the United States, during which the Republic of Puerto Rico was able to survive four days after its proclamation. The book was translated into English under the title "Times of Upheaval".

This historical milestone is narrated from the perspective of the commander of the revolutionary forces in Jayuya, Elio Torresola and his close relatives: his first cousin Blanca Canales, leader of the Nationalist movement in Jayuya; his sister Angelina, who was married to one of the revolutionaries and was later designated acting president of the Nationalist Party; his sister Doris, who was an aide to freedom champion and Nationalist Party president Pedro Albizu-Campos; his brother Griselio, who extended the revolution to the United States by assaulting Blair House, the temporary residence of president Harry Truman in Wáshington; his son Elio Ariel and one of his closest friends, Jayuya resident and Puerto Rican Independence Party follower Sigfredo Rodríguez.

Tiempos revueltos contains a detailed description of the crimes perpetrated by the United States against the people of Puerto Rico during the 20th Century as well as the history of the Nationalist Party and the challenges the organization confronted. The sources of information used to write the novel include interviews with members of the Nationalist army, Torresola family members and their relatives and friends, residents of Jayuya in 1950, the so-called FBI Secret Files on Puerto Rico, released in their entirety to the public by a congressional order and related to the surveillance and compilation of data on nationalists and independence advocates and, more than 600 other sources of information located in the University of Puerto Rico's Puerto Rican Collection, newspaper and periodical libraries and film archives in Puerto Rico, Cuba and the United States.

Several universities and high schools in Puerto Rico have included Tiempos revueltos in their compulsory reading lists and in 2015, during a tribute rendered to him in Havana for being part of the 1950 revolutionary feat and for his unyielding patriotism throughout the years, Jayuya revolutionary Heriberto Marín handed a copy of Tiempos revueltos to Ricardo Alarcón, the president of Cuba's National Assembly (1993-2013) considered for many years the third most powerful political figure in Cuba.

¿Lobos o Ungidos?

¿Lobos o ungidos? (Wolves or anointed?) was published in 2013; this narrative details the investigation and the efforts undertaken to unravel the events that took place at La Santa Montaña de Puerto Rico between 1899 and 2013, including those that took place after the reappearance of the blood allegedly shed at the mountain by Nuestra Madre, the name given by the peasants to the figure they claim was present on the peak between 1899 and 1909.

'Nuestra madre Nuestra madre (Our mother) is a second narrative which completes the trilogy (along with La buenaventura and ¿Lobos o ungidos?) and delves into the mystery of La Santa Montaña de Puerto Rico. Published in 2014, it contains a synopsis of La buenaventura, the latest events regarding the alleged Marian apparition at the mountain, an interview with the bishop emeritus of the Diocese of Caguas, Monsignor Enrique Hernández and testimonies of people who claim they have been healed at the mountain through the intercession of the Virgin Mary or have supposedly witnessed miraculous events there.

Sabras que te quiero

Sabrás que te quiero (Know that I love you) was published in 2017, this is Negretti's second historical novel. The book narrates the indomitable patriotic spirit, the immense love for her family and for the city in which she was born, as well as the social, political and personal events that affected the life of Old San Juan native Emilia Santisteban (née Maldonado) since her 1863 birth until her death in 1952, especially those that took place once she promised to never again step on American soil after having witnessed the October 18, 1898 ceremony at Plaza de Armas (Arms Square) in which invading U.S. troops took over the capital.

The political and social history of the island and the customs, as well as the idiosyncrasy of the Puerto Rican people during the 19th Century and the first half of the 20th century are recreated in detail in this novel, for which the author consulted over 400 sources of information.

Cascabel de la Luna

Cascabel de la Luna (2019) El bohique de Bieke dio por sentado que había logrado cerrar el portal aledaño a la tumba del gran ancestro araguacú, evitando así la desapareción de mujeres durante las noches de luna llena.

La visión menguante del chamán impidió que se percatara de que uno de los símbolos grabados en la piedra colocada en el lugar a manera de conjuro era el equivocado, por lo que varias jóvenes distintas épocas empredieron viajes hacia el futuro a enfrentar situaciones insospechadas, incluyendo la instauración de la República de Vieques.
