= Janette Becerra =

Puerto Rican writer

- Born: 1965 (age 60–61); Caguas, Puerto Rico
- Education: University of Puerto Rico (MA, PhD)
- Occupations: Poet; writer; critic; teacher

Janette Becerra (Caguas, Puerto Rico, 1965) is a Puerto Rican poet, writer, teacher and literary critic. She obtained an MA in comparative literature and a Ph.D. in Spanish literature at the University of Puerto Rico, Río Piedras Campus. She has been a professor of Hispanic Studies at the University of Puerto Rico at Cayey since 2000.

In 2011 she published a collection of stories titled Doce versiones de soledad ("Twelve versions of loneliness") (Ediciones Callejón), which received the First Prize of the PEN Club of Puerto Rico and the Second prize in the contest of the Institute of Puerto Rican Literature in 2012. Her work has been included in Anthology of Twentieth-Century Puerto Rican Literature (Puerto Rico, 2004), Perversions from Paradise (Spain, 2005), The faces of the hydra (Puerto Rico, 2008), Poetry of Puerto Rico: five decades (Venezuela, 2009), The Americas (Portugal, 2010), and In the Eye of the Hurricane (Editorial Norma, 2011).

She has published poetry under the penname,“S. Tornasol.”

== Bibliography ==
- Elusiones (2001). ISBN 978-0847701285
- Doce versiones de soledad (2011). ISBN 978-1881748847
- Antrópolis (2013). ISBN 9781939075079, awarded prize of $12,000 plus publication of her novel.
- Ciencia imperfecta (2014).ISBN 9780865816749
- La casa que soy (2014).

== Writing on her Work ==
- Alegre Barrios, Mario. “La poesía como detonante”. El Nuevo Día, 17 de marzo de 2002, p. 83.
- Carpio, Alejandro. “La belleza y el retiro”. El Nuevo Día, 18 de marzo de 2012.
- Clavell, Manuel. “Aristas”, El Nuevo Día, Revista Domingo, 25 de enero de 2004.
- Hernández, Carmen Dolores. “Doce cuentos maestros y una ñapa: cuentos excepcionales con una escritura fascinante”. El Nuevo Día, 11 de marzo de 2012.
- Hernández, Carmen Dolores. "Literatura femenina en Puerto Rico". La Jornada Semanal 919, UNAM, 14 de octubre de 2012.
- La Torre Lagares, Elidio. "Versiones de la soledad, según Janette Becerra".
- Lladó, Mónica. La violencia y el humanismo como punto común en los Premios de Literatura del Instituto de Cultura Puertorriqueña
- López Baralt, Luce. “La poesía ante el espejo invertidor: las Elusiones y alusiones de Janette Becerra”, Revista La Torre, Año VIII, núm. 28 (2004): 215-229.
- Ramos Collado, Lilliana. El lado oscuro de la ciencia: "Ciencia imperfecta" de Janette Becerra
- Rivera, Juan Pablo. “El cosmopolitismo y la aporía de la hospitalidad en la escritura de Janette Becerra” Ciberletras 31(Dic. 2013, Lehman College).

== Awards ==
- "Premio Nuevas Voces", Festival de la Palabra 2013, Puerto Rico. October 2013.
- International Short Story Award 2012 of the Institute of Puerto Rican Culture, for the "Ciencia imperfecta" storybook. June 2013
- Second National Literature Prize for Doce versiones de soledad. Institute of Puerto Rican Literature (ex aequo with "La R de mi padre", Magali García Ramis). January 2013.
- "Barco de Vapor" Prize of children's literature, Ediciones SM Puerto Rico, for the novel Antrópolis. December 2012.
- National Short Story Prize, Pen Club of PR for Doce versiones de soledad. December 2012.
- First prize in the XIV International Short Story Prize of the Gaceta de Salamanca Foundation, November 2009, Spain, with the story "Soledad perfecta".
- "Doce versiones de soledad" selected amongst "The Ten Best Fiction Books of 2012." El Nuevo Día, December 31, 2012.
- Story Contest Winner of El Nuevo Día 2011.
- Finalist at the XXII International Narrative Short Award at UNED, 2011 (Madrid) with the story "Afición por los terrarios."
- Mention of Honor in "Certamen de Poesía de El Nuevo Día" (March 2011).
- Second prize at the IX International Short Story Award "Encarna León" of Melilla, Spain, with the story "El sastre", March 2010, Melilla (Spain).
