= Blanca de Moncaleano =

Columbian anarcha-feminist journalist

Blanca de Moncaleano was a Colombian journalist, feminist, and anarchist who placed women's liberation at the forefront of her agenda. She and her husband, Juan Francisco Moncaleano, fled Colombia in June 1912 because of political persecution. They eventually settled in California where they helped establish La Casa del Obrero Internacional (The International Workers' Home), where they both published anarchist newspapers.

== Colombia to Mexico ==
The Moncaleanos ran the Casa del obrero (Worker's House) in Bogota, Colombia. After her husband's arrest in 1911, Moncaleano fled with him to Cuba to escape political persecution. They taught at anarchist schools and raised their children there before the Mexican Revolution motivated them to join the fight to reconstruct Mexican society. While in Mexico the Moncaleanos supported the Mexican Liberal Party (PLM - Partido Liberal Mexicano) and the anarchists Flores Magon. She published in the newspaper Tierra, a leftist weekly publication. Following her husband's arrest and expulsion from Mexico by the Francisco Madero regime in 1912, she followed him to Los Angeles, California.

== Los Angeles ==
In Los Angeles, the Moncaleano's continued their anarchist work. They opened and ran La Casa del Obrero Internacional, where Regeneracion (Regeneration) and Pluma Roja (Red Pen) were printed. She wrote for Regeneracion, publishing her first essays in 1913. She was vocal in the subject of woman's liberation, contradicting the position of the leaders of PLM who thought that it was the woman's place to push them into becoming revolutionaries. She demanded that women become revolutionaries. She, like most anarchists, did not believe in national borders or in economic classes. This was part of the political, economic and religious oppression of the people.

== Pluma Roja ==
Moncaleano was the director and editor of the periodical Pluma Roja which published from 1913 to 1915. The motto of the newspaper is as follows: "'Ante mi la estrella del ideal. Tras de mi los hombres. No miro atras.' (Before me, the star of ideal. Behind me, men. I do not look back)." This newspaper networked with the international anarchist movement while recording the position women held in society. "For Pluma Roja, unquestioned patriarchal authority, upheld by religion and the state, was the target of its red pen." Her articles encouraged women to gain their freedom through knowledge, urging men to convert the enslaved women into anarchist thinkers and criticizing men who fought for liberation while encouraging the enslavement of women. She believed that anarchy was the solution to problems of gender and class.
