= Irene Vilar =

Puerto Rican writer

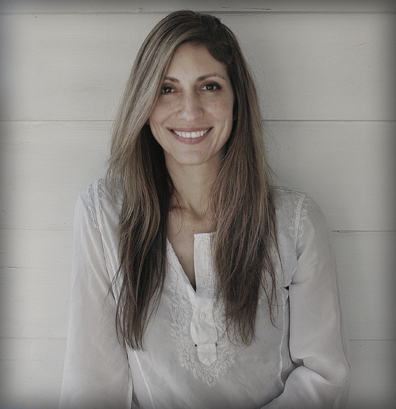
- Born: c. 1969 (age 56–57); Arecibo, Puerto Rico
- Education: Syracuse University
- Occupations: Author; environmentalist; editor
- Children: 2
- Relatives: Lolita Lebrón
- Website: www.irenevilar.com Archived September 4, 2014, at the Wayback Machine

Irene Vilar (born c. 1969) is a Puerto Rican American editor, literary agent, environmental advocate, and author of several books dealing with national and generational trauma and women's reproductive rights.

== Biography ==
Born in Arecibo, Puerto Rico in 1969, Vilar is the granddaughter of Puerto Rican nationalist Lolita Lebrón, who participated in an assault on the United States House of Representatives in 1954. After her mother's suicide in 1977, she attended boarding school in New Hampshire at age 15 before enrolling at Syracuse University where she married her literature professor, Pedro Cuperman.

Her work The Ladies' Gallery: A Memoir of Family Secrets (originally published in 1996) was a Philadelphia Inquirer and Detroit Free Press notable book of the year, a finalist for the Mind Book of the Year Award and the Latino Book Award. Her memoir, Impossible Motherhood: Testimony of an Abortion Addict (published in 2009), revealed that the author had 15 abortions in 17 years. Vilar received death threats after its publication. It won the 2010 IPPY Gold Medal for Best Memoir/Autobiography and the 12th Latino Book 2nd Place Award for Best Women’s Issues.

She founded her own literary agency, Vilar Creative Agency, and serves as a co-agent in the United States for Ray-Gude Mertin Literary Agency, an agency specializing in Spanish, Latin American, and Portuguese authors, which represented writers as 1998 Nobel Prize laureate Jose Saramago. In 2007, Vilar founded the Colorado and Puerto Rico based non-profit Americas for Conservation + the Arts and is its current executive director.

In 2010, Vilar was awarded a Guggenheim fellowship for her nonfiction writing. Also that year, she gave the keynote at the 2010 National Convention of State Senators and Legislators Hispanic Caucus on Latino Mental Health, “Severe Depressive Disorder: Overcoming Adversity and Stigma” where she talks about the trauma she experienced growing up and in her marriage. She serves on the advisory council of the Colorado Office of Outdoor Recreation Industry and the Green Leadership Trust.

After Hurricane Maria in 2017, Vilar founded the Resilience Fund through her non-profit to help farmers restore their farms.

== Works ==
- Vilar, Irene (2009). The Ladies' Gallery: A Memoir of Family Secrets. Other Press. ISBN 9781590513736.
- Vilar, Irene (October 6, 2009). Impossible Motherhood: Testimony of an Abortion Addict. Other Press. ISBN 978-1-59051-320-0.
