= Isabel Andreu de Aguilar =

Puerto Rican writer, educator, activist, and philanthropist

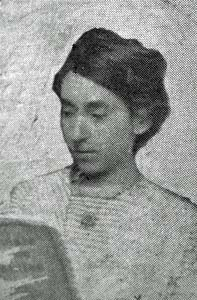
- Born: November 15, 1887; Fajardo, Puerto Rico
- Died: April 7, 1948 (aged 60); San Juan, Puerto Rico
- Occupations: writer, educator, philanthropist

Isabel Andreu de Aguilar (née Isabel Andreu y Blanco; 15 November 1887 in Fajardo – 7 April 1948) was a Puerto Rican writer, educator, philanthropist, suffragist and women's rights activist. She participated in the founding of the Puerto Rican Feminist League and was a co-founder of the Association of Women Graduates of the University of Puerto Rico. She was the second president of the Puerto Rican Association of Women Suffragists and was one of the first women to run for a senatorial seat once they achieved enfranchisement.

== Early years and education ==
Isabel Andreu y Blanco was born on 15 November 1887, in Fajardo, Puerto Rico, to Cristóbal Andreu Comendador and Blanca Irene Blanco Guzmán. At the time of her birth, the island was an administrative district of Spain and her father, originally from Majorca, later became the mayor of Fajardo. Her mother was a native Puerto Rican. After attending elementary school, she won a scholarship to attend Normal School in 1902, graduating in 1907 as one of the first class of alumni of the Escuela Normal of the University of Puerto Rico.

== Career ==
Andreu began work as a teacher in the model school affiliated with the university, but soon returned home to Fajardo where she continued teaching. In 1917, when the Carnegie library was created, she was appointed to serve on the board of directors. That same year, she became the vice president of the Puerto Rican Feminist League (Spanish: Liga Femínea Puertorriqueña), which was founded by Ana Roqué (1853-1933). The League was active in trying to gain women the right to vote and when their local senator, Antonio Rafael Barceló, refused to discuss the matter, Andreu, María L. de Ashford and Milagros Benet de Mewton went to plead their case in Washington, D.C. In 1921, the organization changed its name to the Suffragist Social League (Spanish: La Liga Social Sufragista) and expanded its platform from women's suffrage to full civic and political participation. In 1924, Andreu, along with Rosario Bellber, Maria Cadilla de Martínez, Luisa Callejo, Beatriz Lasalle, Ana López de Vélez, Roqué, and Amina Tió de Malaret all resigned from the League over ideological differences. The following year Roqué and Andreu formed the Puerto Rican Association of Women Suffragists (Spanish: Asociación Puertorriqueña de Mujeres Sufragistas). The crux of the ideological split was whether extending the vote to women should include universal suffrage or whether it should be restricted to educated women. Andreu and Roqué were in the camp which favored education as a prerequisite to voting. That same year, 1925, Andreu was appointed to serve on the Board of Trustees of the University of Puerto Rico.

In 1929, Andreu was selected as president of the Association of Women Suffragists and the women were successful in attaining the vote for literate women. In 1932, Andreu ran as a Senator for the Liberal Party, the first woman ever to run. After losing the election, Andreu returned to school and completed a Bachelor of Education at the University of Puerto Rico in 1935. Later that year, she studied sociology at Columbia University, and later graduated with a Master in Arts specializing in adult education. In 1936, Andreu and other professional women founded the Association of Women Graduates of the University of Puerto Rico with the goals of improving the professional, academic and cultural development of its members and the university. Throughout the 1930s and 1940s, she continued her trusteeships with the Library and University, as well as public speaking engagements and writing on topics ranging from education to women's rights to adult literacy. Andreu died on 7 April 1948 and posthumously, a building at the University of Puerto Rico was bestowed with her name, as well as a street in San Juan and another street in her native Fajardo.
