= Ana Roque de Duprey =

Puerto Rican activist (1853–1933)

- Roque was one of the founders of the University of Puerto Rico
- Born: Ana Roqué Geigel; April 18, 1853; Aguadilla, Puerto Rico
- Died: October 4, 1933 (aged 80); Río Piedras, Puerto Rico
- Occupations: Educator and suffragist
- Spouse: Luis Duprey

Notes
- Roque founded the Puerto Rican Feminist League, the first feminist organization in Puerto Rico dedicated to the issues of women's rights.

Ana Roqué de Duprey, also known as "Flor del Valle" (Flower of the Valley) for her work in botany, (April 18, 1853 – October 5, 1933,) was an educator, scientist, suffragist, and one of the founders of the University of Puerto Rico. She studied botany, astronomy, geology, and meteorology with Agustín Stahl and contributed to these disciplines with her own studies and publications. Roqué also founded the first woman's suffrage organizations in Puerto Rico in 1917.

== Early years ==
Roqué (birth name: Ana Roqué Geigel) was born in Aguadilla, Puerto Rico on April 18, 1853. Roqué's mother, who was a teacher, taught her to write by the age of three. Her mother died when she was only 4 years old; she was raised by her father, aunt, and grandmother, who were all educators. At the age of seven, her father sent Roqué to private school, where she studied at twice the rate of her peers, and ended up graduating at the age of nine. She continued her homeschooling and in 1864 at the age of eleven, became the youngest teacher's assistant in Puerto Rico. Roqué then was educated at home, with special emphasis on the sciences. Some areas she studied were botany, zoology, geology, meteorology, and astronomy. In 1866, at age 13, she founded a school in her house. Roqué also wrote a geography textbook for her students, which was later adopted by the Department of Education of Puerto Rico. She applied for her teacher's license and passed the examinations.

== First Puerto Rican woman to become a member of the Public Library ==
In 1872, she married Luis Duprey, a well-to-do landowner who was involved in politics. At the time of their marriage, Duprey was a slaveowner, and one of Roqué's conditions to marriage was that she be able to educate the slaves. She developed an interest in the politics of Puerto Rico. With Duprey, she had five children. Three survived to adulthood: Luis Enrique, Borinquen, and America.

The family moved to the capital of San Juan, where she became the first woman to be permitted into the Puerto Rican Athenaeum and the first woman to become a member of the Public Library. During her spare time, she composed music. In 1880 her husband died, leaving her with young children to care for.

== Author and publisher ==
In 1884, Roqué was offered a teacher's position in Arecibo, which she accepted. She also enrolled at the Provincial Institute where she studied philosophy and science and earned her bachelor's degree. In 1899, Roque was appointed as the director of the Normal School of San Juan.

In 1898, Roqué founded La Mujer, the first "women's only" magazine in Puerto Rico. She also wrote articles for the following newspapers: El Buscapie, El Imparcial and El Mundo. She founded other women's publications and some of general interest: La Evolucion (1902), La Mujer del Siglo XX in (1907), Album Puertorriqueño (1918) and Heraldo de la Mujer (1920).

In addition to articles, Roqué wrote several books, both fiction and non-fiction. They include the following: Sara, La Obrera and Luz y Sombra. Her book Puerto Rican Flora received acclaim and an award from the Fourth Century Christian Civilization Organization.

In the early 1900s, Roqué began work on the study Botánica Antillana, a study of Caribbean flora in which she documented over 6,000 species of plants with color illustrations as well as medicinal and agricultural properties.

Roqué, who also had a passion for astronomy, was made an honorary member of the Paris Society of Astronomers. In 1923 she published results from her astronomical observations in El Cielo de Puerto Rico.

== Founder of University of Puerto Rico-Mayagüez Campus ==
In 1902, Roqué founded a teachers' academy in her house. Roqué also taught and prepared students for their teacher's examination with the Department of Education. As a result of her growing interest in education, Roqué founded the Liceo Ponceño (a girls' high school in Ponce) and the College of Mayagüez. (The latter developed as the Mayagüez Campus of the University of Puerto Rico). She also contributed to the founding of the University of Puerto Rico campus in San Juan.

== Women Suffrage Movement ==
In 1917, the federal government passed the Jones Act, which allowed all male adult citizens from the U.S. and Puerto Rico to vote for representatives to the island's legislature. This clearly did not apply to women, and thus Roqué and others spurred to action. Roqué and other professional women founded the Liga Femínea Puertorriqueña, also known as the Puerto Rican Feminist League. This was the first feminist organization in Puerto Rico dedicated to the issues of women's rights. Roqué utilized her publications as a way to advance the suffrage cause. After the creation of the organization, it became apparent that the 19th Amendment did not apply to Puerto Rico. As a result, in 1921, the organization focused a broader scope including civil and political rights for women. This new organization focused on seeking more civil and political rights, such as the right to hold public office, became the Suffragist Social League. This new and expanded organization focused on the argument that women were experienced in child-care, and accordingly qualified to hold authority over issues related to youth, education, and poverty. This was a common argument then as it expanded the rights of women without overturning the social roles of the different genders. By 1924, the women had divided over political differences, and Roque led followers to found the Association of Women Suffragists. They fought for women's suffrage without restrictions (such as literacy or means tests). The first phase was approved in 1932 and in 1935, all women of voting age were allowed to vote.

== Death ==
Ana Roque de Duprey died on October 4, 1933 in Río Piedras, Puerto Rico at the age of 80. She was buried at Cementerio Villa Nevárez in Río Piedras, Puerto Rico.

== Legacy and honors ==
In 1932, the University of Puerto Rico awarded Roque an honorary doctorate degree. She was also named honorary president of the Puerto Rican Liberal Party.

In 1933, Ana Roqué Géigel de Duprey died in Río Piedras, and a memorial has been done to honor her life. A high school in Humacao, Puerto Rico and a street in San Juan are named for her. An elementary school in Chicago, Illinois, which has a large Puerto Rican population, is named after her.

Roque was posthumously named an honoree of the National Women's History Alliance in 2020.

A recording about Ana Roqué de Duprey was recorded by former President Obama's administration, as a part of an effort to recognize "The Untold History of Women in Science and Technology".

== See also ==
- List of Puerto Ricans
- French immigration to Puerto Rico
- History of women in Puerto Rico
