= Arts in Transit =

1980s public art project in Boston's Orange Line

Arts in Transit was a public art initiative undertaken that began in 1984 and 1991 on the Orange Line in Boston's Southwest Corridor. It was designed and implemented by the nonprofit organization UrbanArts, working as a subcontractee of the Massachusetts Bay Transportation Authority. The program installed artworks, poetry, and prose in nine stations along the Orange Line, from Tufts Medical Center in Chinatown (formerly New England Medical Center) to Forest Hills in Jamaica Plain. Arts in Transit included off-site projects in photography and oral history. It involved the community in the selection of artwork and was the second project in the country to use federal dollars to site art in public transportation after Arts on the Line in Cambridge.

== History ==
Arts on the Line was finishing its work on the Northwest Extension of the Red Line when the non-profit group UrbanArts applied for, and won, a bid to site public artwork on Orange Line. Pamela Worden was the first director of the Cambridge Arts Council and helped to approach federal transportation authorities for Arts on the Line before founding UrbanArts. Worden oversaw the Arts in Transit project. UrbanArts was solely responsible for working with both the MBTA and the communities around the soon-to-be-built stations. The bid to facilitate the public art in the stations was won in 1983 and work started in 1984, though the design process of the stations was already completed and construction had begun.

== Boston Contemporary Writers poetry and prose ==
Boston Contemporary Writers was a literary competition and poetry and prose siting that ran from 1986 to 1987 and was launched to provide a written component to balance the visual emphasis of the permanent art of Arts in Transit. UrbanArts held a state-wide competition that solicited works of either poetry or prose that would eventually be permanently inscribed on granite in each of the nine stations. To achieve this, they built a community advisory board to conduct outreach and formed a separate selection panel that would conduct a blind review of submitted manuscripts. Two works were chosen for each station, for a total of eighteen pieces of writing. Some authors had never had work published before, others, such as Gish Jen, were relatively well-known and well-regarded writers with popular publications to their name. While some of these works are within stations, others are within surrounding parkland or adjacent to station entrances. Poet Sam Cornish directed the project for UrbanArts.

=== Along the El photography project ===
Along the El (sometimes also The Artist’s Lens: A Focus on Relocation) was a documentary photography project completed between 1985 and 1987, proposed to UrbanArts by Linda Swartz. Boston’s elevated Orange Line, which ran from Chinatown to Forest Hills Station in Jamaica Plain, was built in 1901. By the 1980s the line was showing its age and abutting neighborhoods were suffering from lack of sunlight, noise from rusted brakes, and grime. The MBTA and Department of Transportation planned to dismantle the old elevated line and relocate it along the Southwest Corridor. The project paired five professional photographers with seven high school students from Hubert H. Humphrey Occupational Resource Center in Roxbury to document the architecture, the people, and the general feeling of the “El” before it was demolished. The five photographers were Linda Swartz, project director, David Akiba, Lou Jones, Jack Lueders-Booth, and Melissa Shook.

Images from the project were donated to the Boston Public Library and were digitized for wider availability through the Digital Commonwealth initiative.

== Sources of Strength oral history project ==
Working together with Roxbury Community College, UrbanArts let current students and Southwest Corridor residents learn how to collect oral histories. Sources of Strength: People and History Along the Southwest Corridor eventually included interviewers and community advisors, who together collected oral histories from communities surrounding the Southwest Corridor. The project dates were September 1986 to December 1987.

In 1988, a theatrical performance using these oral histories as text for the script was presented at the Massachusetts College of Art together with Northeastern University. Northeastern also showcased an exhibit that included text and portraits of the storytellers in 1991.

== Arts in Transit: The Southwest Corridor artworks ==
The nine stations that comprise the Southwest Corridor were built after the historic cancelled I-95 highway project. The following is a list of the ten artworks created for Arts in Transit, all installed in stations along the Southwest Corridor of the Orange Line.

Title	Image	Artist	Station	Location	Year	Medium	Reference
Caravans	Richard Gubernik, Caravans	Richard Gubernick	Tufts Medical Center (formerly New England Medical Center)	Platform level		Painted aluminum wall relief	*
Neon for Back Bay (Note: This artwork is no longer installed at the station.)	Stephen Antonakos, Neon for Back Bay	Stephen Antonakos	Back Bay	North and south entrance arched windows, subway entrance, and ceiling of subway headhouse	1990-2020	Neon sculpture	*
Massachusetts Avenue Installation	Bruce Taylor, Massachusetts Avenue Installation	Bruce Taylor	Massachusetts Avenue	Above north tracks near stairway leading down to platform		Suspended sculpture	*
Stony Brook Dance	John Scott, Stony Brook Dance	John T. Scott	Ruggles	North end of vaulted walkway	1994	Suspended multipart sculpture	*
GEOM-A-TREE	Paul Goodnight, GEOM-A-TREE	Paul Goodnight	Ruggles	Bus waiting area/south entrance		Wall mural	*
Neighborhood	Susan Thompson, Neighborhood	Susan Thompson (original sketch by Allan Crite)	Roxbury Crossing	Main lobby		Vinyl canvas banners	*
Faces in a Crowd	James Toatley, Faces in a Crowd	James Toatley	Jackson Square	Platform		Fiberglass reinforced resin sculpture with bronze fillings	*
Life Around Here		Malou Flato	Stony Brook	Curved lobby wall	1994	Glazed ceramic tile mural	*
Color Passage	Virginia Gunter, Color Passage	Virginia Gunter	Green Street	Lobby area walls and windows		Suspended stained glass and perforated metal sculpture, 20 units	*
Transcendental Greens		Dan George	Forest Hills	Public lobby and adjacent exterior walkway	1994	Aluminum plate forms	*

=== Poetry and Prose ===
In 1986- 1987 UrbanArts held a statewide competition to solicit works in poetry and prose that would be inscribed in granite and permanently installed in the new Orange Line stations and adjacent parkland. This anthology of work by urban writers went far beyond the expectations of the MBTA for its art program

Granite monuments inscribed with text located at the following Orange Line stations:

Station	Poetry	Prose
Forest Hills	"The Subway Collector" by Thomas Hurley	"Lies" by Ethan Canin
Green Street	"Drift" by Mary Bonina	"Reflections" by Daria MonDesire
Stony Brook Station	"Mrs. Baez Serves Coffee on the third floor" by Martin Espada	"The Dinner" by Rosario Morales
Jackson Square	"Grandmothers" by Thomas Hurley	"Any Good Throat"
Roxbury Crossing	"Hometown" by Luix Virgil Overbea	"At Roxbury Crossing" by
Ruggles	“Harriet Tubman aka Moses” by Samuel Allen	"Four Letters Home" by Will Holton
Massachusetts Avenue	My Robe" by Peter Rodman	"Drum" by Sharon Cox
Back Bay	"Counterpoint" by Jane Barnes	"If my Boundary Stops Here" Ruth Whitman

== Links ==
Along the Elevated: Photographs of the Orange Line at Digital Commonwealth
