= Esmeralda Santiago =

Puerto Rican writer (born 1948)

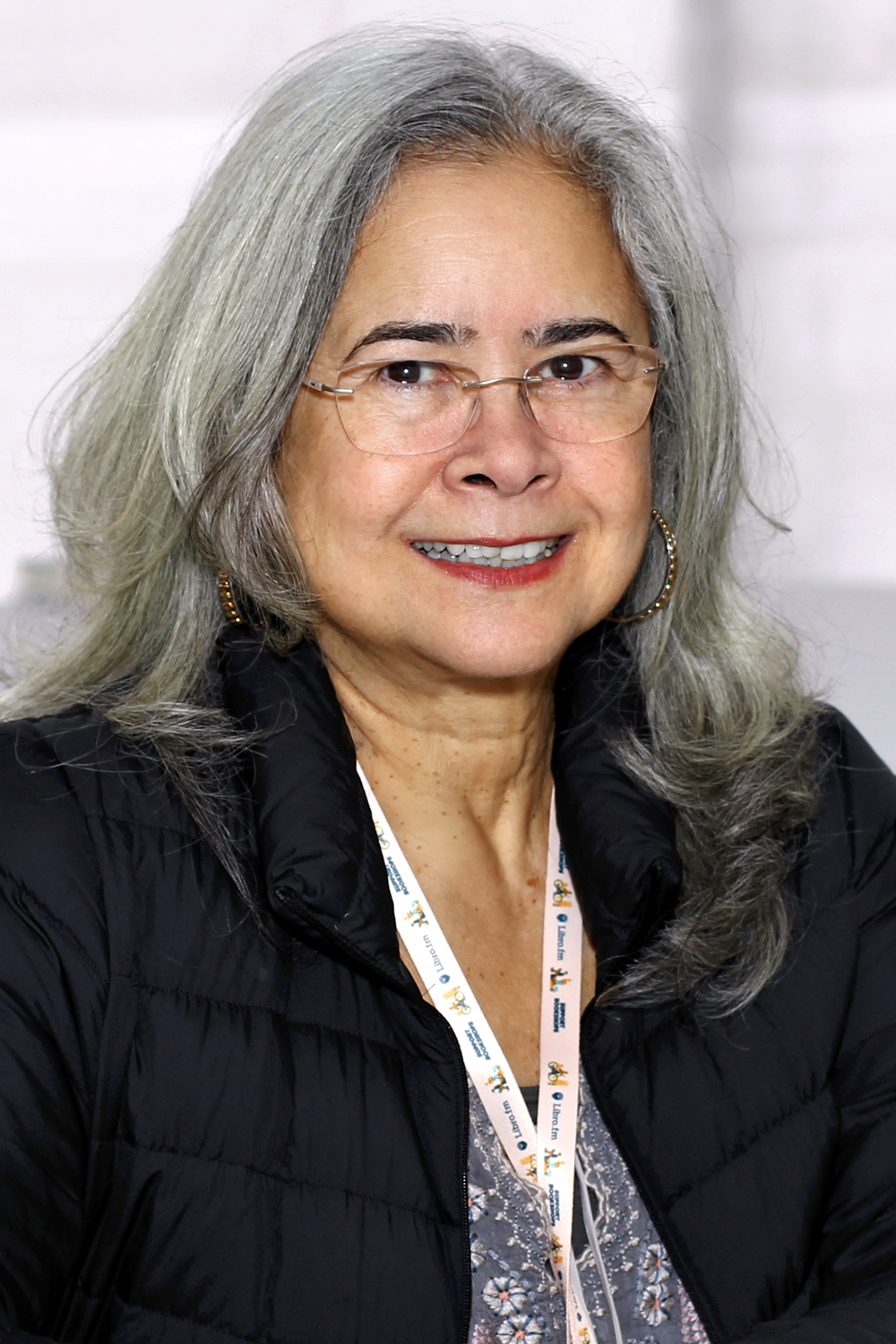
- Santiago at the 2023 Texas Book Festival
- Born: May 17, 1948 (age 78); San Juan, Puerto Rico
- Education: Sarah Lawrence College, Harvard University
- Occupations: writer, actress
- Spouse: Frank Cantor
- Children: Lucas Cantor
- Writing career
- Notable works: When I Was Puerto Rican, Almost a Woman, The Turkish Lover, Conquistadora
- Website: www.esmeraldasantiago.com

Esmeralda Santiago (born May 17, 1948) is a Puerto Rican author known for her narrative memoirs and trans-cultural writing. Her impact extends beyond cultivating narratives as she paves the way for more coming-of-age stories about being a Latina in the United States, alongside navigating cultural dissonance through acculturation.

== Personal life ==
Santiago was born on May 17, 1948, in the Macún neighborhood of Toa Baja, Puerto Rico. She was the eldest of eleven children, raised mostly by her mother and partly by her father, though they were never married. Her family lived in the countryside and was descended from poor, peasant farmers. In 1961, at age 13, she moved to the United States. Santiago attended junior high school in Brooklyn and learned English in two years, then attended New York City's prestigious Performing Arts High School. Upon graduating, Santiago attended community college and worked various jobs for eight years. After, she earned a full scholarship from Harvard, where she transferred and received her undergraduate degree and graduated Magna Cum Laude in 1976. She continued her graduate education at Sarah Lawrence College where she received a master's degree in Fine Arts degree in 1992. Santiago met and married Frank Cantor prior to graduating. The couple founded Cantomedia, a film and media production company, which has won numerous awards for excellence in documentaries. Santiago currently lives in Westchester County, New York with her husband.

=== Health ===
In 2008, Santiago noticed her manuscript, which she wrote the day before, was unintelligible and appeared like a foreign language. Her symptoms led her to believe she possibly suffered from a stroke, and after a doctor's visit and tests, her suspicions became confirmed. The stroke affected the Wernicke's area of the brain and made her unable to read and write in both Spanish, her native language, and English. Santiago relearned how to read and write English, as she did when she learned at age 13. Children's books with illustrations helped Santiago connect words to the images, teaching her brain to read again.

Today, her reading and writing ability remains partially unrecovered. When she suffered her stroke, her novel, Conquistadora, was unfinished and her main goal in relearning written English was to finish it. She improved enough to complete her novel, but remained unable to do the Spanish translation of her piece herself. Santiago continues to write today and can produce about 300 words per day post-stroke, whereas she completed 1000 words a day prior. Her stroke, its effects and her ability to relearn language are chronicled in neurology magazines and other medical pieces, making her a case study for strokes and stroke recovery.

== Literature ==
=== When I was Puerto Rican ===
When I was Puerto Rican was published in 1993 and takes an autobiographical approach to Santiago's childhood. It details her life from early childhood and stops at her departure from Puerto Rico at age 13. She narrates growing up under imperialistic American ideologies that often conflict with her Puerto Rican culture. Aspects like familial relationships, food and coming-of-age are highlighted throughout the piece. After receiving her degree from Harvard, Santiago returned to Puerto Rico to work. She experienced cultural dissonance as many Puerto Ricans considered her overly Americanized while Americans racially ostracized her for being Puerto Rican. Additionally, it became difficult for her to find employment, like other highly educated women in Puerto Rico. Santiago chose to return to the United States and began publishing short essays and stories in local press. She wrote When I was Puerto Rican after gaining attention and encouragement from an editor in the United States. Santiago's writing illustrates the important perspective of someone who experiences both Puerto Rican and American culture from an outside lens.

Santiago states that she chooses to "write for women. I don't care if men read my work... It's women's lives I'm interested in." Her intention in writing is to bring light to the patriarchal tendencies of Puerto Rican culture, both in the United States and on the island of Puerto Rico. In When I was Puerto Rican, Santiago illustrates sexist experiences from her own life, extending recognition to other women who experienced similar treatment.

=== Cultural identity in writing ===
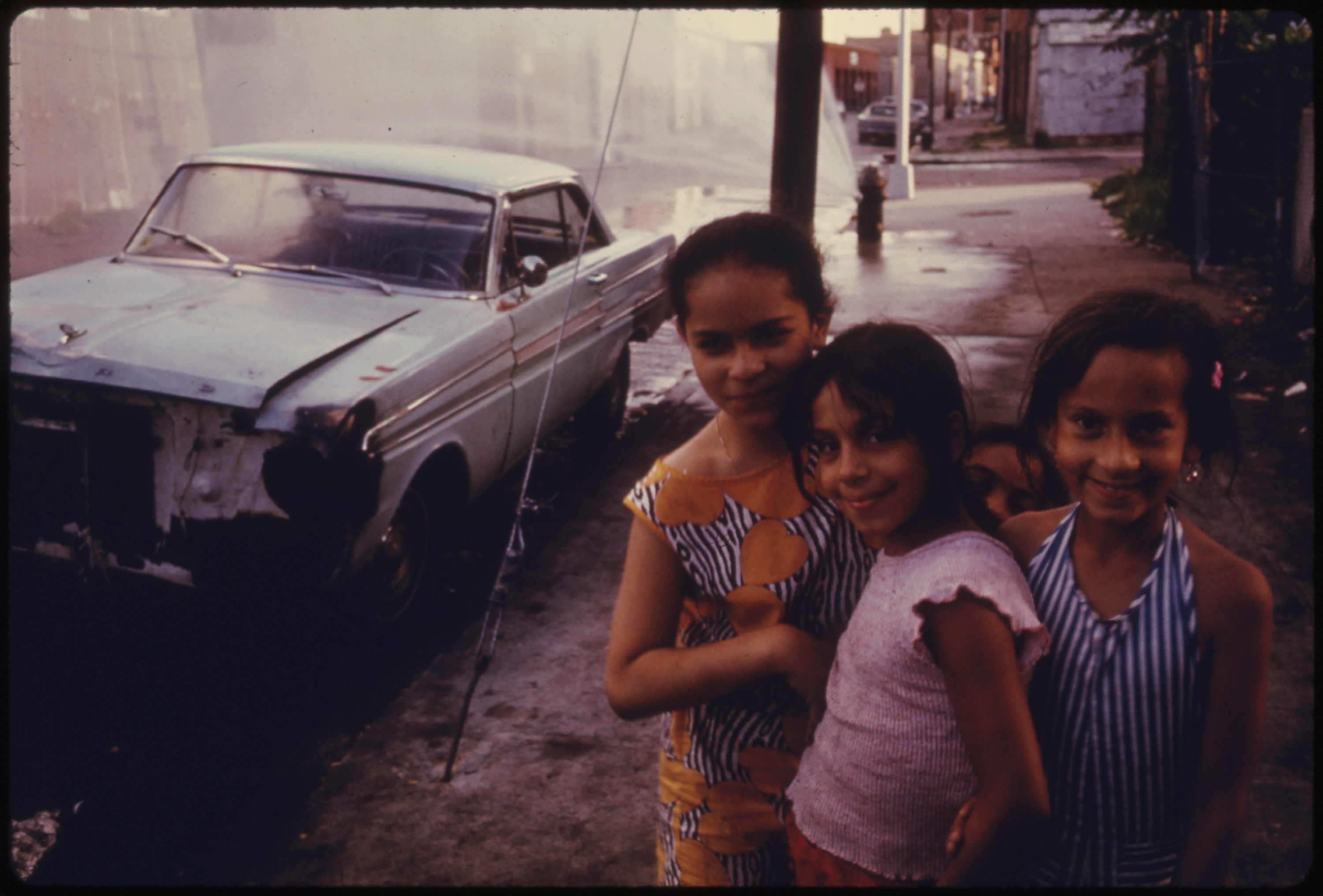
Boroughs like Brooklyn and Washington Heights are known to be predominantly Puerto Rican after the surge of immigration after World War I.

Santiago's childhood involved moving from one home to another, specifically from one island to another. This experience shaped her personal identity and influenced her literary work. Santiago's memoir, When I Was Puerto Rican, presents her Puerto Rican background as a formative aspect of her life, rather than as an obstacle to her later achievements, such as graduating from Harvard and winning a Peabody Award. The memoir's openness and vulnerability are central to its impact. Santiago's upbringing in Puerto Rico is revisited from the perspective of someone who has lived in Western culture for over thirty years, without rejecting her past. Her work suggests that Puerto Rican identity is complex and multifaceted, with origins as significant as those of U.S. culture. She resists simplifying her cultural background to fit into a single narrative or to assimilate into dominant ideologies. Santiago does not conform to stereotypes or mainstream expectations in her writing, and she does not present an idealized version of her Puerto Rican upbringing. When I Was Puerto Rican candidly addresses issues such as misogyny in Puerto Rican culture, but does not use these as reasons to dismiss her overall experiences. Instead, she offers critique while acknowledging the dualities in her identity, rather than reducing herself to a hybrid identity that requires abandoning parts of her background. Santiago writes: “I suppose that my life today is about looking at and trying to come to terms with ifs. Human beings are obsessed with the question of ‘who am I’? For someone like me, issues of identity are weighted and complicated by the event that has defined who I have become, because it was the migration from Puerto Rico to the United States that made me who I am."

=== Almost a Woman ===
In Almost a Woman, published in 1998, Santiago extends upon her memoir When I was Puerto Rican and continues from her late childhood through adolescence in the United States. The main character, Negi, experiences identity crises at the hands of adolescence while simultaneously navigating acculturation after her move from Puerto Rico to Brooklyn, New York. Negi is faced with deciding how she would like society and her family to perceive her, forcing her to define how Puerto Rican and American she would like to be. Acquisition of English is Negi's first stride towards bridging the gap between her Puerto Rican upbringing and her American school, as once she can speak English, her cultural identity becomes more fluid.

Santiago demonstrates the plight of Puerto Rican women living in the United States as they battle cultural identities. Her piece includes a scene in which Negi performs a play and celebrates with her American cast-mates at the end. She sees her parents far away and notices their cultural differences, and she also recognizes the dissonance between her cast-mates and herself. Like many other daughters of immigrants, Negi plays the role of the in-between: not Puerto Rican to her family, yet not American to her classmates. The in-between space marks her acculturation as she embodies both, yet neither, of the cultures. While Negi's cultural position is common to immigrants, there is a paucity of literature regarding that subject, and Santiago creates a new path for daughters of Puerto Rican immigrants by recognizing and popularizing the difficulty of acculturation. pp

=== Feminist literature ===
Despite Esmeralda Santiago's recognition as an author, she did not begin writing until she was 38 or 39, starting with essays in magazines and local newspapers. Her first draft of When I Was Puerto Rican was over 700 pages long, which was later condensed into the sequel, Almost a Woman. The book examines Santiago's adolescence and her experience of becoming a woman in a cultural context different from that of previous generations in her family. In an interview, Santiago discussed why Puerto Rican writers often emphasize connections to their ancestors and the matriarchal line in their work. She attributes this to being raised by strong women who, despite limited resources, instilled ambition and resilience. Santiago identifies her mother as a significant influence on her writing. Through her work, Santiago contributes to discussions of feminism that consider both cultural and gender identities. For women of color, femininity and racial identity are interconnected, and Santiago's perspective has influenced Latin feminist literature.

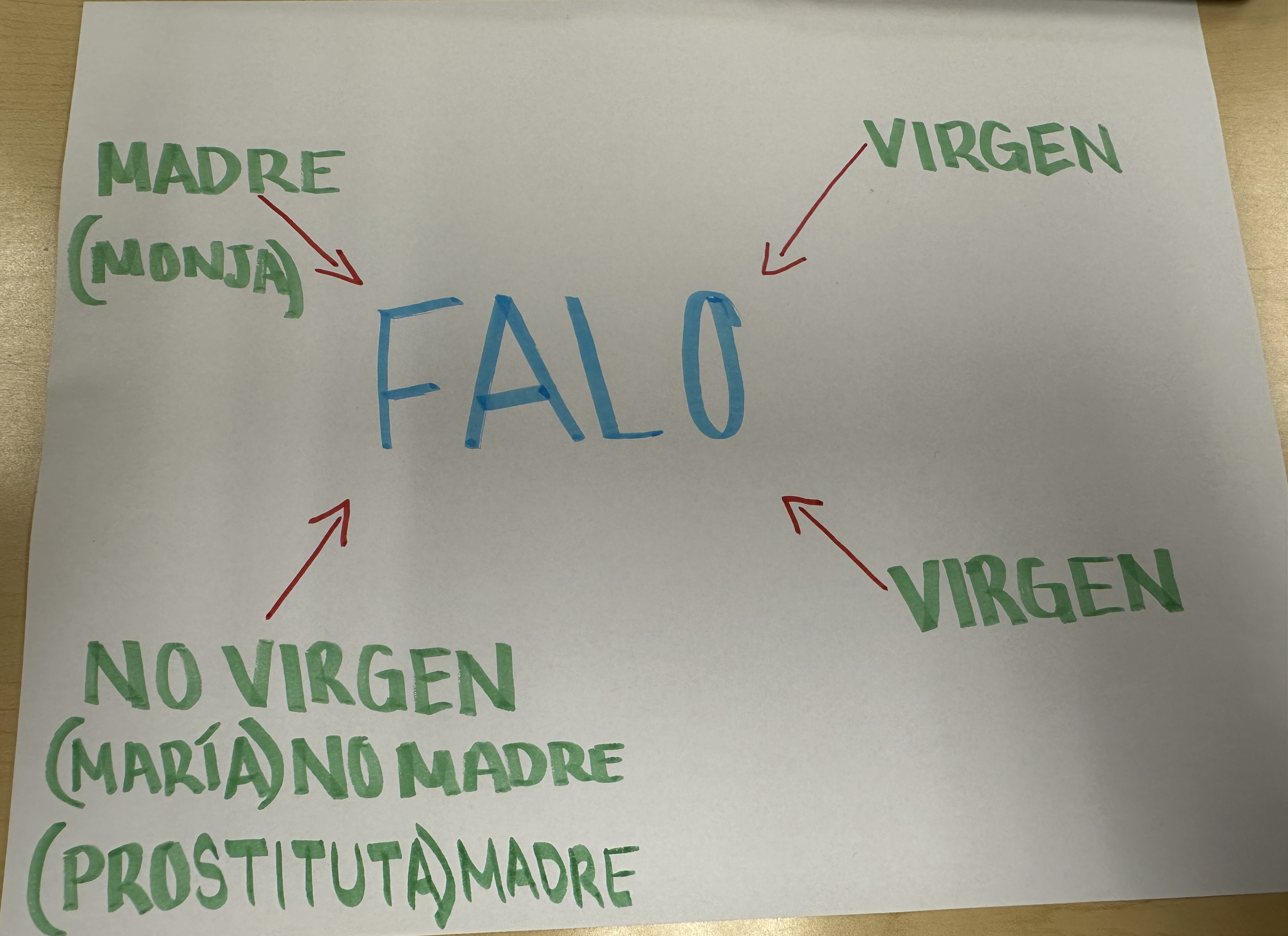
This diagram, inspired by the ideas of Latino culture scholar, Silvia Nagy Zekmi, depicts female archetypes in their relation to motherhood.

=== Gender and culture ===
In her memoir, Santiago describes a complex relationship with her mother, including disagreements about her future. For example, Santiago writes, “I would just as soon remain jamona than shed that many tears over a man." Throughout her work, she examines gender expectations present in Puerto Rican culture. Santiago's approach to feminism and independence is sometimes described by others as Americanization, though she addresses the complexities of cultural influence and does not attribute her perspective solely to Western ideas. Her writing explores the negotiation between cultural backgrounds and personal beliefs without rejecting her Puerto Rican heritage.

In an interview with Santiago, the interviewer reflected, “She had to understand what it meant to almost be a señorita, a mature and respectful young woman, and felt the need to find a space between what was expected from her by U.S standards and what was expected from her by Puerto Rican standards.

"Santiago states that she chooses to "write for women. I don't care if men read my work... It's women's lives I'm interested in." Her intention in writing is to bring light to the patriarchal tendencies of Puerto Rican culture, both in the United States and on the island of Puerto Rico. In When I was Puerto Rican, Santiago illustrates sexist experiences from her own life, extending recognition to other women who experienced similar treatment.^{[9]}

=== The Turkish Lover ===
The Turkish Lover, published in 2004, illustrates Santiago's love affair with a Turkish film-maker, Ulvi, and documents its abusive aspects. The memoir picks up where Almost a Woman leaves off, and Negi escapes from her mother's home to run away with Ulvi. Through Ulvi's control, Negi, now nicknamed "Chiquita" by Ulvi, slowly loses aspects of her Puerto Rican identity, and by the end of their eight-year relationship, Chiquita no longer recognizes modern Puerto Rican pop culture. She matriculates into Harvard and begins to argue and defend political topics surrounding popular issues—including Puerto Rico. Chiquita then travels back to Puerto Rico and is struck by the mass destruction of natural beauty and the food-chains and big-box stores that replace it. The separation she feels from Puerto Rico is solidified and the narration shifts from third-person to first, as Santiago claims the main character for the first time in any of her memoirs and describes the sensation of coming into one's self and feeling solidified in one's identity. In claiming herself, she also breaks free from Ulvi, and graduates Magna Cum Laude from Harvard with no one in the audience.

Unique to The Turkish Lover is Santiago's claim to the main character, alongside the different names the main character goes through throughout the piece. Her final memoir serves as a reclamation of her identity documenting the turbulence throughout her journey of acculturation and her abusive relationship. In the end, the protagonist 'Santiago' is the same one that is writing, demonstrating personal growth and the achievement of defining oneself.

=== Conquistadora ===
Conquistadora is a novel published in 2011. It follows Ana's characterization as she battles oppressive societal expectations of gender, class and race in 19th century Puerto Rico. Ana arrives in Puerto Rico at the age of 18 in search of power and money but instead faces the harsh realities of slavery on her sugar plantation. She becomes forced to navigate a society in which morality and immorality exist cohesively.

In writing Conquistadora, Santiago researched and explored Puerto Rican history extensively. Puerto Rican records and literature did not include narratives of women, the economically disadvantaged or enslaved peoples. Coming from a poor, rural family, Santiago did not have records of her family's history, and Conquistadora is an imagined example of what her history could have been. Like other Latino writers of this time, Santiago's writing serves as both a tool to discover and uncover her cultural identity, seen heavily in her exploration of her family's history. Santiago also touches on the devastating impact of slavery on the people of Puerto Rico; something often glanced over by popular literature as some considered slavery in Puerto Rico to be less severe than in other nations.

=== Other works ===
- A Doll for Navidades, a children's book written by Santiago, outlines her childhood Christmas traditions and includes her writing to the Three Magi to receive a doll for Christmas. Unlike many of her other pieces, the book is catered towards children but like her other pieces, it brings greater societal awareness to Puerto Rican culture and experiences.
- America's Dream, published in 1997, depicts a Puerto Rican woman's first encounters with the United States in suburban New York while also navigating a strained relationship with her daughter.
- Las Christmas, a collection of stories about the holidays by twenty-five Latino authors, was edited by Santiago.
- Las Mamis: Favorite Latino Authors Remember Their Mothers is a collection of stories about author's mothers and was edited by Santiago.
- The screenplays Beverly Hills Supper Club and Button, Button.
- Santiago is a contributor to the anthologies Home: American Writers Remember Rooms of Their Own and Perspectivas Sobre Puerto Rico en Homenaje a Muñoz Rivera y Muñoz Marín, Fundacíón Luis Muñoz Marín.
- Las Madres is a powerful and heartbreakingly accurate portrait of those unimaginable hours and seemingly interminable days after the storm, and its plots and characters’ stories center around one important theme: the battle against forgetting.

== Impact ==
Santiago creates feminist literature that is catered towards women, promote CP in High Schools paving the way for more women-centered narratives of the Latino experience. Autobiographies done by women were ignored until the late 1980s, meaning that not many pieces existed to inspire Santiago's work. Her use of the autobiographical, memoir-like, format allows for discussions of women's societal gender role, biculturalism and bilingualism from a place of personal experience, making her work even more impactful on the reader. Additionally, as one of the first to write in this format, Santiago paved the way for exploring Puerto Rican and Latino identities in popular literature. Her writing allows more young, Latine, women and youth to feel justified in their journeys for cultural self-identification and fulfillment.

=== Influence on Latin literature ===
On Santiago's autobiographical writing one scholar says, "Hence, Esmeralda Santiago writes to denounce the mandated gender dichotomy and establishes instead a platform from which others can speak and share their own experiences and development of their identities. The author breaks with the notion of categorizing women based on their relationship with phallogo centric society." Santiago says her memoir is the journey to finding who she is, “I suppose that my life today is about looking at and trying to come to terms with ifs. Human beings are obsessed with the question of ‘who am I’? For someone like me, issues of identity are weighted and complicated by the event that has defined who I have become, because it was the migration from Puerto Rico to the United States that made me who I am." Santiago is known alongside other Latina writers like, Cherrie Moraga, Aurora Levins Morales, Rosario Morales, and Gloria Anzaldúa. Santiago and these writers are known for counteracting patriarchal and western standards in their writing through linguistic and gender expectations. "They challenge traditional notions about the genre of “autobiography” through their form and their content. They subvert both Anglo and Latino patriarchal definitions of culture. They undermine linguistic norms by using a mixture of English, Spanish and Spanglish. All address the question of the politics of multiple identities from a position which seeks to integrate ethnicity, class, gender, sexuality, and language."

Santiago has stated on the matter: "Well, I think good writers come, and I think publishers are also much more open to finding voices that are different from the traditional ones, let’s say. And now we’re writing a lot in both languages, English and Spanish, and it’s being translated from Spanish to English, English to Spanish, so there’s an exchange between readers as well."

=== Critical recognition and honors ===
Santiago and her work have been recognized by several distinguished award committees. Her most recent award was in 2022. Santiago was awarded with a grant that will help develop a Literary Arts program designed with the National Museum of Puerto Rican Art and Culture. When I was Puerto Rican was also incorporated into the Yale curriculum by Lisa Galullo in 2010. The course was entitled: Truth and Identity in Autobiography: Teaching Esmeralda Santiago's memoir When I was Puerto Rican. The sequel to When I Was Puerto Rican, Almost a Woman, received a Peabody Award in 2002 for its film adaptation. The screenplay was also written by Santiago herself.In that same year, Santiago was awarded the National Women of Distinction Award along with Hillary Clinton, Katie Couric, Elizabeth Dole, Alma Powell, and Vera Wang. From 2000 to 2016, Santiago served as a cultural ambassador for the United States State Department. Her educational assignments took place in Argentina, Bolivia, Colombia, the Dominican Republic, Germany, Iceland, India, Indonesia, Kazakhstan, Mexico, Russia, South Africa, Spain, and Venezuela.

== See also ==
- List of Puerto Rican writers
- Nuyorican Movement
- Puerto Rican literature
- Giannina Braschi
- Rosario Ferre
- Ana Lydia Vega
- Jaquira Díaz
- Quiara Alegria Hudes
