= Sam Cornish =

- Born: Samuel James Cornish; December 23, 1935; Baltimore, Maryland, U.S.
- Died: August 20, 2018 (aged 82); Boston, Massachusetts, U.S.
- Occupations: teacher; writer; poet
- Spouses: Jean Faxon (m. 1968; div. 1972) Florella Orowan (m. 1976)
- Writing career
- Period: 1961–2018
- Genre: Poetry
- Literary movement: Black Arts Movement
- Military career
- Allegiance: United States
- Branch: United States Army
- Service years: 1958–60
- Website: www.samcornish.com

Samuel James Cornish (December 22, 1935 - August 20, 2018) was Boston's first poet laureate. He was associated with the Black Arts Movement. He taught at Emerson College.

Cornish was an educator, a bookseller, and a prolific poet who made sense of African American history and urban life through his poetry. As the first poet laureate of Boston, he worked to make poetry accessible to those not traditionally interested in the art form.

== Biographical information ==
=== Early life (1935–1960) ===
Cornish was a born in Baltimore, Maryland. He lived his early life with his mother, grandmother, and older brother Herman in a small apartment on McCulloh Street in the Druid Hill section of West Baltimore, a primarily African-American neighborhood. Cornish did not grow up with his father. He wrote about this experience in his first book of poems:

It was the most natural thing being without a father. You just never saw him in the house. Suddenly you were in the world. No memories except you were moving around doing things. This is how it begins. It’s like you were always there, and he never was...

During the Depression-era economy, Sam's mother Sarah supported the family by working mainly as a domestic, with seasonal work at the post office. She developed medical conditions that prevented her from doing physical labor, so Cornish and his brother were obliged to find employment. During his adolescence, Cornish worked as a hospital orderly, a janitor, a clerk in a kosher deli and an insurance salesman. He graduated from the Henry Highland Garnet School in the Upton neighborhood and attended the Frederick Douglass High School but left after one semester at the age of 17 because he was uncomfortable socializing with children from more affluent families. He attended both Goddard College and Northwestern University.

In 1958 Cornish was drafted into the army. After boot camp, he spent two years at Ft. Benning, Georgia, which he later regarded as a mainly positive experience because, he said, for the first time, he was able to have enough to eat and access to health care. Owing to fallen arches and extreme presbyopia, he was not a good candidate for military maneuvers so spent the remainder of his induction on K.P., peeling potatoes and as an army medic. He later claimed that doing this undemanding work left him ample time to continue his reading.

=== 1961–1981 ===
In 1962 Cornish published a chapbook titled People Beneath the Window. According to Carrington Bonner, writing for Black Books Bulletin, “…there’s an old man at New Era Bookstore in downtown Baltimore who will tell you he has sold over 1,000 copies…” He was interviewed by the Baltimore Sun about this period:

Back in Baltimore he knocked around for awhile, doing odd jobs and trying to figure out what to do with his life. He was drawn to the civil rights movement, which was starting to rumble, and took part in the 1963 March on Washington. That experience inspired him to write a poem, which appeared soon after in a newsletter. "I was really excited," he says of his first published work. "It gave me the chance to bear witness to an important moment of history."

By 1964, Cornish had become active in the small press scene and his poems were appearing in various literary magazines. Through these publications, he was making contacts—not only among poets but in the community of neighborhood activists and social workers. He formed associations with the Baltimore Multi-Service Center, a community-based organization, and with the Enoch Pratt Free Library, promoting not only his writing but the writing of others in the community, including writing by children.

At that time, there was increased interest in promoting the writings of inner-city youth and adults. In 1966, his efforts resulted in his first major publication, Chicory, an anthology of writings by children and adults that was published by the Association Press, a subsidiary of the YMCA. The Enoch Pratt Library currently features an article on the history of the magazine:

Chicory differed from a traditional literary magazine in several ways. It initially focused on writings by residents of the Baltimore community action target area in East Baltimore, an impoverished, predominantly African American neighborhood, though it would grow through neighborhood-based community centers to encompass the entire city. It published pieces with no editing and also published snippets of overheard conversations or poems told to one of the editors. It gave Baltimore’s poor communities an outlet for their thoughts and ideas. As the November 1969 issue proclaimed, “The purpose of this magazine is to publish work overheard by the editor which reflect the music of language in the inner city; to encourage more spoken and written comment by people in the community action area; and to inform those other people and agencies within the area of our ways of living.”

Chicory continued for some years after Cornish had moved to Boston. In fact, it was featured in a book on Baltimore's history. The Baltimore Sun described him as: “…...a local poet who has become a sort of literary talent scout in the inner city. Mr. Cornish launched “Chicory,” a magazine devoted largely to impromptu writing by children; he edits “Mimeo,” a poetry magazine that attracts work from across the county; and he started “”Bean Bag,” a magazine sponsored by the Methodist Church's “Operation Crowded Ways” project. Mimeo published such poets as Ruth Whitman, Ron Schreiber and Ottone Riccio.... Beanbag Press published chapbooks by, among others, Emmett Jarrett, Norman Hoegberg and William Doreski.

In 1968 he married Jean Faxon, a graduate student in social work at the University of Maryland. He was working for Baltimore's Community Action Agency. She was from Lenox, Massachusetts, so they decided to move to Boston, where he found employment in two local bookstores. On one visit back to Baltimore, he had a disagreement with personnel at the Lombard Junior High School and believed he was “banned from Baltimore.” An article in the Evening Sun, “Come Home, Sam,” sought to clear up the mistake. The article describes him as a “teacher at the Highland Park Free School” in Roxbury, MA, although he was hired specifically as a curriculum specialist because of his work on Chicory and similar community-based involvements.

By the late 1960s, he was settled in Massachusetts and connecting with the local poetry community. A flyer produced by the Harvard Advocate announcing a weekly poetry reading in Harvard Square on April 18 (1968) has an index card stapled to it: "Sam Cornish will be reading..." The flyer mentions Mimeo and his chapbook People Beneath the Window and that he worked in a local bookstore. Another small announcement in the Boston Globe states that he was reading with poet Ruth Whitman at the Arlington Street Church. In 1967 a chapbook entitled Winters was published by the Sans Souci Press and a broadside, The River, was printed by the Temple Bar Bookshop in 1969.

Cornish's work on “Chicory” led to a job as an educational consultant and curriculum specialist for the Central Atlantic Regional Education Laboratory in Washington, DC, where his job involved designing reading materials for classroom use. In 1969, he was hired as an educational advisor by the Education Development Center work with their Project Follow Through in Newton, MA:

Follow Through was the largest and most expensive experimental project in education funded by the U.S. Federal Government that has ever been conducted … originally intended to be an extension of the federal Head Start program....(for) typically disadvantaged preschool children and their families.

In this position, he created writing materials such as booklets and broadsides for primary school students, and advised their teachers about the open education project. He also traveled to Paterson, NJ, Philadelphia and Washington to provide parents and teachers with information about open education. An article In the News of Paterson New Jersey describes a workshop:

…the purpose of which was to orient the Paterson staff to the philosophy of the Education Development Center Follow Through Model... Sam Cornish, EDC of Boston Mass, was in charge of the creative writing sessions…

At EDC, he photographed the communities to which he traveled, as well as the students and teachers with whom he worked. His employment with EDC Follow Through lasted through 1979.

Working with children's writing through Chicory and Follow Through inspired him to write books for children. His first commercially published children's book, Your Hand in Mine, was issued by Harcourt, Brace in 1970. It was well received and, according to Black World, “His excursion into the field of children’s stories is a gem…” This was followed in 1974 by Grandmother’s Pictures, described by the New York Daily News as “Possibly the first black Mother’s Day book ever written.” Grandmother’s Pictures, evocatively illustrated by Jeanne Johns, is not, strictly speaking, a book for children but rather an all-ages reminiscence in verse that the author described as a “disconnected mood picture.” Grandmother’s Pictures was one of his most successful books. In 1976, Bradbury Press published a hardcover version and, in 1978, Avon published a mass market edition.

In 1971 Beacon Press issued his first full-length book of poems titled Generations. It was also the title of a chapbook he had self-published in 1967, although there is little similarity between the two beyond the title and one or two of the poems. The book-length Generations, unlike the chapbook, contained topics and themes that he would revisit many times in his later work. It was a very promising start and, according to Clarence Major, “The poems are clear and sharp, with no excess fat." According to various reviewers over the course of his career, Sam Cornish would become known for his “perfect pitch” and “unerring sense of cadence,”.

By 1972, his marriage to Jean Faxon had ended and, in 1976, he married his second wife, Florella Orowan, and they remained married until his death in 2018. She was a bookseller and together, they opened a small bookstore, Fiction, Literature and the Arts, in the Boston suburb of Brookline.

In 1979, Cornish began working as Literature Director at the Massachusetts Council on the Arts and Humanities. Cornish held the position for only three years, although during that time, he advocated vigorously for small and literary presses to receive matching-grants funding.

Cornish was Poet-in-Residence at Emerson College from 1979 to 1980.

His book Sam’s World was published by Decatur House Ltd. in 1980. In Black Books Bulletin, Carrington Bonner wrote that the poems “are clear images to the point of the themes, with perceptive acknowledgement of the dark beautiful/ugly realities of the inner city from which he came. Simplicity and sure hand are tools that are not easily contained by a poet. Sam’s World shows off these unique qualities.” In Callalloo, E. Ethelbert Miller wrote: “I was happy to discover that Sam’s world was real, not imaginary. It is one in which people occupy a major space.” Both reviewers were impressed that Cornish was not “seeking inner exile,” as poets tend to do, but rather writing about real world experience.

=== 1982–2004 ===
From 1982 to 2004, Cornish was an instructor in the department of Writing and Publishing at Emerson College. During his time at Emerson, he introduced and taught courses in the Harlem Renaissance, Jewish writers, Holocaust literature, literature of the American West, literature of World War II, gay literature and Irish writers, among others. The period between 1982 and his eventual retirement in 2004 was the height of his career—as a writer, teacher and scholar.

In addition to teaching, Cornish was a contributor to the ‘’Christian Science Monitor’’, reviewing numerous titles in African-American literature, mainstream American Literature, genre fiction and more from 1984-1986. At the same time, the bookstore he and Orowan owned was publishing a book review magazine titled Fiction, Literature and the Arts Review, to which he contributed. In 1984 he moderated a panel discussion at the Cambridge Public Library on Black writing, sponsored by the bookstore, which published a special issue of the magazine focusing on that topic. In addition to his wife’s store, he worked at Avenue Victor Hugo in Boston, Paperback Booksmith in Cambridge and New England Mobile Book Fair in Newton, where he was still employed until a few months before his death.

During this time he also taught courses in fiction, poetry, and publishing at Boston Adult Education Center (1983-1988).

In 1985, Unicorn Press published Songs of Jubilee, a collection of new and selected poems. Many of the poems deal with topics from African-American history. This approach, digging deeper into the history of both his local community and the larger African American population, would become the focus of his next three books.

In 1986, Cornish was named director of the literature project called Boston Contemporary Writers for the MBTA Orange Line, under the auspices of UrbanArts, Inc of Boston, and oversaw the installation of literary monuments at subway stations along the MBTA’s Orange Line until 1988. The overall project, called Arts in Transit, was funded by the Massachusetts Bay Transportation Authority and managed by UrbanArts. Cornish’s role was typical of his approach to literature – that it be made more visible and accessible to the public. He would later follow this same model in his position of Boston Poet Laureate.

In 1990, Cornish's memoir titled 1935 was published by Ploughshares Books. A combination of prose and poetry, it follows a timeline paralleling his life to that point. It was reviewed on NPR’s "All Things Considered" by Alan Cheuse:

1935 is a powerful collage of portraits of Baltimore ghetto street life, figures from Sam Cornish’s own family, of simple poems about growing up black and swatches of history and sociology. All of it makes for quite a striking and effective narrative rhythm.

Cheuse described the work as “an odd amalgam of ego and history, prose and poetry, hymns to Harlem and the deep South and the music of Ruth Brown and the courage of Martin Luther King and all kinds of shades of skin from black to brown to sepia to pink and back again. All of this contrives to give the feeling of the era: this innocent through dangerous world lurching toward World War II, and the sensuous tone of being black in Baltimore in 1935.”

Two years later, Cornish struck up a relationship with the owner of Zoland Books, who published two collections of his poetry. The first one, Folks Like Me (1992) received a fair amount of attention from several periodicals. Choice magazine considered it a “powerful collection” and “highly recommended.” Library Journal notes the “wealth of history” contained in poems about Joe Louis, John Coltrane, Frederick Douglass and Booker T. Washington and recommended it for most collections. Maya Angelou contributed a back cover blurb, comparing the book's contents with the artistry of Ray Charles’ blues. The other book, Cross A Parted Sea, features poems darker than Cornish's previous works and imply a parting of the waves — both in America and in his relationship with poetry. The book is more profane than his earlier work, with frequent racial slurs and crude language. Cornish had begun to write in voices other than his own. When reading these poems aloud, he would preface his performance with disarming comments apologizing for “using dirty words.” These poems are also based on historical subjects.

The mixture of folklore, cultural stereotypes and satire was a technique frequently used by Cornish.

=== 2005–2018 ===
After retiring from teaching in 2004, Cornish focused on writing and collaborating. He wrote An Apron Full of Beans, published by Cavankerry Press in 2008. It was a ForeWord Magazine Book of the Year finalist and finalist in the Milt Kessler Poetry Award for 2009. Adam Tavel, writing for the Café Review had the following reaction:

Time and again in these poems, Sam Cornish trespasses the accepted borders between public history and private experience by evoking the voices of slaves, sharecroppers, and historical figures such as Frederick Douglass in one large cultural conversation that is self–sustaining without the added burden of arguing against Whitman’s vision of nationhood.

The book had sufficient impact, at least locally, such that Marshall Hughes, Theatre Director of Mainstage, Roxbury Community College in Boston, reworked it as a stage production and his troupe gave a number of performances of it around the Boston area. An Apron Full of Beans was not Cornish's only experiment with multimedia collaboration. A few years later, he performed on a regular basis with the Lemonshiners, a local bluegrass group. Their music proved a very suitable accompaniment to his poems about, in particular, the Civil War and the American West

Perhaps his most comprehensive multidisciplinary achievement was his final book of poems, Dead Beats. Published by Ibbetson Street Press in 2011, it includes 11 of his black-and-white photographs. In Dead Beats, he reclaims his generational identity with and affection for the Beats. Michael T. Steffen, writing for the Wilderness House Literary Review, commented on the “magic of joining words” that the title implies, but it is even more typically Sam Cornish's inclination to remind the reader that these writers, often depicted as vital, larger-than-life personae, are now a part of history. On the jacket blurb, Martha Collins comments that “Cornish makes us feel the excitement of those times, even as he and his companions absorb the complex and often disturbing history of what he aptly calls “My Young America.”

Unlike his previous several books, in which he wrote about and echoed voices from the past or assumed other identities, in Dead Beats, Cornish returns to the first person and his own identity. The poem Dead Respectability, about the poet John Wieners, takes aim at poetry publishing and its readership: the poet / looking for cigarette butts / in the gutters of Common / wealth Avenue / is not a bum living alone on Joy / Street he's John Wieners / his friends in poetry will speak well / of him after he's dead... John Wieners was a frequent visitor at the Fiction, Literature & the Arts Bookstore in Brookline and Cornish had considerable respect for his work, and so the poem grows increasingly personal as the writer confesses his identification with an outcast, as Wieners was viewed in his later years. With these poems, as well as a few others in this collection, Cornish pays homage to some of the odd and unusual characters he knew who had provided him with poetic material.

In 2008, Cornish became Boston's first poet laureate after a committee of half a dozen individuals from various neighborhoods in Boston and diverse walks of life selected him among a large group of applicants. In the mission statement accompanying his application, he promised to focus on outreach and after assuming the post, he outlined his goals: “I try to be the person to bring a poem to people who might not read poetry, or those who want to talk to a poet about the craft.”). An interdepartmental e-mail from the Mayor's Office states that in the first year of his term as poet laureate, he “made over 40 appearances at schools, libraries, community centers, bookstores and other venues. Most of these appearances have been in workshop format. Mr. Cornish typically reads from his work, talks about his role as the poet laureate, and hears poetry from participants.” In addition, he was given an office at the Copley Square Branch of the Boston Public Library, where he held meetings and out of which he held classes and scheduled special events. He also represented the Mayor's Office of Arts & Tourism at various public events and seasonal occasions at which once again, his objective was to bring poetry to a wider audience.

=== Death ===
In late 2015, Sam Cornish was diagnosed with an hereditary cardiac amyloid condition. He lived with it for more than two years before succumbing to a major stroke in August 2018. He is buried at the National Cemetery in Bourne, MA.

== Poetic influences and style ==
By the time Generations was published, Cornish had already begun to hone his poems to the bullet-point brevity of his later work. He addressed this in his biographical statement he submitted to Contemporary Poets: “I try to use a minimum of words to express the intended thought or feeling, with the effect being starkly frank at times.”

In a poem about the assassination of Dr. Martin Luther King (“Death of Dr. King,” 1971), Cornish depicted rage not in mounting cascades of language but in a devastating quick brushstroke: “we are mourning//our hands filled with bricks//a brother is dead.”

The poetry of Sam Cornish does not follow strict poetic form. In an interview with Boston Magazine, given shortly after he was elected Poet Laureate, he responded to the comment that his work was mainly free verse:

I believe that spoken language has its own qualities, and sometimes its own literary qualities. I think there’s an in-between where there’s truth. There’s a form to my work, but it has more to do with jazz and the Negro spiritual and the conversational tone of the Beats. .. The Beats sort of communicated better than any writers in my time …about what it is to be a person in a particular time and place.

When asked about the informal tone of his style, he replied:

I think what you do is you try to find the best means of bringing your voice to a reader. I’m not too sure that given my presence, and my manner, that I wouldn’t be a little pretentious or appear a little unreal if I was a more formal writer because I’m not that kind of a person.

== Relationship to the Black Arts Movement ==
Cornish is identified as one of the poets of the Black Arts Movement – a politically motivated literary movement of the 1970s that promoted African-American identity and solidarity. When asked about his relationship to those poets, he answered:

A lot of that (militancy) was directed at whites generally. It was confrontational or abrasive. You were now BLACK and different from previous generations. You had no patience with your forefathers, your parents, those who were living as NEGROES. It was a very angry and self-destructive ideology. People like James Baldwin, Langston Hughes and Robert Hayden were viewed as not being pro-black.

In another interview, when asked about his identity as a writer of protest literature, he replied that if he were, he would be protesting social currents relative to the literature of the Great Depression It is instructive to realize that, during the 1970s when the Black Arts Movement flourished, he was well into his thirties and somewhat older than many of the writers in the Black Arts Movement. His views on art and life had been formed by reading writers such as Georges Simenon, John P. Marquand and MacKinley Kantor, and poets such as William Carlos Williams, e.e. cummings, Robert Penn Warren and, Langston Hughes. Despite his criticism of some Black Arts Movement writers, however, he maintained cordial relations with Dudley Randall, founder of Broadside Press, and former US Poet Laureate Gwendolyn Brooks. As a poet, Cornish did not view himself as part of any particular movement or style. He did, however, see himself as part of an artistic tradition. When responding to an interview question by poet Afaa M. Weaver regarding his heritage, he replied:

Before I was born, my mother was visited by the spirits of three men. One was a film composer, a Jewish émigré working in Hollywood or Warner Brothers. The second was an Irish-American novelist and the third was a Negro poet who was writing poems about blues, jazz and the Negro in history. They told her they were following a star that had stopped over the city of Baltimore.

== Works ==
=== Poetry books ===
- Dead Beats (Ibbetson Street Press, 2011)
- An Apron Full of Beans (CavanKerry Press, 2008). Adapted for the stage as a play written and directed by Marshall Hughes and performed at various venues in the Boston area, 2012
- To Cross A Parted Sea (Zoland Books, 1996)
- Folks Like Me (Zoland Books, 1992)
- Songs of Jubilee–New & Selected Poems (Unicorn Press, 1985)
- Sam’s World–Poems (Decatur House, Ltd., 1980)
- Generations–Poems (Beacon Press, 1971)

=== Pamphlets/Chapbooks ===
- A Reason for Intrusion: Poems by Three Poets (Fleming-McAlister Press), 1972
- Angles (Self-published, no date). Dedicated to Eliott Coleman
- Sometimes (Pym Randall Press), 1973
- Generations (self-published), 1965
- Winters (Sans Souci Press), 1967
- In This Corner (Fleming-McAlister Press), 1964
- People Beneath the Window (Sacco Pub.), 1962/1965(?)
- Short Beers Beanbag Press, 1969 (n.d.)

=== Memoir ===
- 1935–A Prose Memoir (Ploughshares Books, 1990)

=== Children's books ===
- Grandmother's Pictures (Bookstore Press, 1974)
- Your Hand in Mine (Harcourt Brace, 1970)
- Chicory: Young Voices from the Black Ghetto (Association Press, 1969)

=== Anthologies ===
Included in the following:

- American Literary Anthology (Viking Press)
- New Black Poetry (Wm. Morrow)
- Black Fire (Wm. Morrow)
- Drum Voices (Doubleday & Co.)
- New Voices in American Poetry (Winthrop Pub.)
- English for a New Generation (McGraw Hill)
- Memory of Kin (M.H. Washington, ed.) (Doubleday & Co.)
- Our Daily Bread (Kathleen Aguero, Ed.)
- Poetry Connection (Poets and Writers)
- The Poetry of Black America Arnold Adoff, Ed. (Harper & Row)
- You Better Believe It (Penguin Publishers)
- Daily Fare Kathleen Aguero, ed. (University of Georgia)
- An Ear to the Ground Harris & Aguero, Editors (University of Georgia)
- Beneath Another Sky (Scott Foresman)
- Generations Arnold Adoff, Editor (Follett)
- Men of Our Time Moramarco & Zolynas, Editors (University of Georgia Press)
- Crossing Boundaries (Mc Graw Hill)
- Rereading America (Bedford Books/St. Martins)
- African American Alphabet Hausman & Rodriques, Editors St. Martins
- The Garden Thrives Clarence Major, Editor (Harper Perennial)
- Reflections on A Slice Of Water Pickle (Scott Foresman)
- Pierced By A Ray Of Light (Harper & Row)
- Letters to America Jim Daniels, Editor (Wayne State University Press)
- Memory of Kin Mary Helen Washington, Editor (Doubleday & Co.)
- Christmas 1968: 14 Poets D.R. Wagner, Ed. (Black Rabbit Press)
- My Black Me: A Beginning book of Black Poetry Arnold Adoff, Ed. E.P. Dutton, 1994
- Contemporary Black Biography, Vol. 50 Sara and Tom Pendergast, Eds. (Thomson Gale)
- Letters to America: Contemporary American Poetry on Race Jim Daniels, Ed. (Wayne State University Press)
- The Living Underground: An Anthology of Contemporary American Poetry Hugh Fox and Sam Cornish, Eds. (Ghost Dance Press)
- The Ploughshares Poetry Reader Joyce Peseroff, Ed. (Ploughshares Books)

=== Literary Periodicals ===
Cornish's poems have appeared in: Kenyon Review, Ploughshares, Essence Magazine, Agni Review, Evergreen Review, University of Tampa Poetry Review, Black Poetry, Work, Obsidian, Greenfield Review, Ann Arbor Review, Camels Coming, Hiram Review, Grand Street Magazine, Hanging Loose

=== Editorships/Reviews ===
Editor, Chicory (periodical/book); Book Review Editor, Fiction, Literature & the Arts Review; Publisher/Editor, Mimeo Magazine and Beanbag Press; Guest Editor, Ploughshares, Ann Arbor Review; book reviews published in The Christian Science Monitor, The Boston Globe, The Boston Herald, The West Coast Review of Books, Contemporary Literary Criticism, Kenyon Review, Harvard Review, Boston Review, Essence Magazine, Fusion Magazine, Ploughshares, Harvard Book Review, Boston Review of Books.

As subject: critical article in Contemporary Literature, Fall/Winter 1992; extended review of book 1935 in Kenyon Review, Fall 1992; 1935 subject of review on “All Things Considered,” National Public Radio, 1991; Review of Cross A Parted Sea, Winter Issue, Boston Review of Books (1996). Review in Shenandoah (1973) for Generations; Review in Southern Humanities Review (1992) for 1935; Reviews in Publishers Weekly (various dates) for Grandmother's Pictures (several editions). Critical Study: Writing America Black by C. K. Doreski (Oxford University Press

=== Grants/Awards ===
- St. Botolph Society Foundation Award, 1992 (NEA)
- Grant, Mass. Council on the Arts, (1990) “Mass Productions” – to write 1935.
- NEA Fellowship (1967)
- NEA Award (given to writers published in the American Literary Anthology)
- ALA Notable Book Citations (for Grandmother's Pictures and Chicory)
- Provincetown Poetry Workshop (1997)

=== Posthumous Publications ===
- “A Crossing Guard of Poetry and Life by Bryan Marquard,” Boston Globe, August 20, 2018.
- Remembering Sam Cornish,” a six-part series of programs presented by the Cambridge libraries on his poems and photographs. Summer, 2019
- African-American Poetry: 250 Years of Struggle & Song Kevin Young, Ed. Library of America, 2020
- “In the High Cloudless Afternoon” Hanging Loose 111 Hanging Loose Press, 2020
