= Axel Foley (rapper) =

American rapper

- Born: Axel Dahlen; July 30, 1991 (age 35); Minneapolis, Minnesota, United States
- Genres: Hip Hop, Alternative Hip Hop, Underground Hip Hop
- Occupations: Rapper, songwriter
- Years active: 2010–present
- Label: Independent
- Website: www.axelfoley.com

Axel Dahlen, better known by his stage name Axel Foley, is an American underground hip hop musician based in Minneapolis, Minnesota, United States.

== Career ==
In 2010, Foley and a few friends began performing locally at demonstrations, benefit concerts, and small shows at parties and venues such as Acadia Café, and The Madusa. 2011 saw Foley playing other hip hop shows around town.

In September 2012, released his debut EP at a day long block party which he and frequent collaborator Manny Phesto performed at. The event Hip Hop Harambee, ran two consecutive years 2012, 2013 and featured local and national recording artists, dancers, visual artists, producers, and DJs including: Big K.R.I.T., Talib Kweli, Devin The Dude, Shabazz Palaces, Gritty Committee (Greg Grease & Freez), Mike the Martyr, Metasota, DJ Frank Castle and others.

In 2015, Foley released his Mike the Martyr produced MOOD LP.

In May 2015, Foley performed with Manny Phesto, Mike the Martyr, and DJ Frank Castle at the 8th annual Soundset Music Festival which was named the "Best Hip Hop Festival Around" by MTV". He was featured on Sway Calloway's Sway in the Morning show on Eminem's Shade 45 channel aired on Sirius XM. He and Manny performed at the 26th annual Saturday in the Park on July 4 in Sioux City, Iowa, and Summer Set Music and Camping Festival in Sumorset, Wisconsin. as well as Festival Ajusco in Mexico City

== Discography ==
=== EPs ===
- (2012) "Work in Progress EP"

=== Albums ===
- (2015) MOOD
