= Southside Looking In =

Studio album by Manny Phesto
- Released: June 19, 2014
- Recorded: 2014
- Genre: Alternative hip hop Underground hip hop hip hop
- Length: 36:00
- Label: Independent
- Producer: Mike the Martyr

Southside Looking In is the first album from Minneapolis hip hop artist Manny Phesto, It was released independently in 2014.

== Music ==
The entire record is produced by Mike the Martyr. It features guest appearances from Axel Foley, Greg Grease, Akrite, Metasota, as well as Mike the Martyr.

== Reception ==
Critical response to Southside Looking In was favorable. Pitchfork listed it in the "Best MN Hip-Hop Releases of 2014". City Pages named it one of "The Best Minnesota Rap Albums of 2014". 89.3FM The Current gave it their "Album of the Year" title Several critics on Reviler.org and the journalists who participated in Twin Cities Critics Tally placed this album in their top ten list for 2014.

== Track listing ==
No.	Title	Producer	Length
1.	"Reality Check"	Mike the Martyr	2:44
2.	"Cedar Ave"	Mike the Martyr	2:17
3.	"The Account" (featuring Mike the Martyr)	Mike the Martyr	3:51
4.	"Rooftops (Interlude)" (featuring Metsota)	Mike the Martyr	0:21
5.	"Eternity In The Cities" (featuring Axel Foley)	Mike the Martyr	3:14
6.	"Standards" (featuring Akrite)	Mike the Martyr	3:07
7.	"Hi-Lake" (featuring Greg Grease)	Mike the Martyr	2:38
8.	"Goodnight Moon (Interlude)"	Mike the Martyr	0:30
9.	"Full Scope"	Mike the Martyr	4:13
10.	"To The Sea"	Mike the Martyr	2:00
11.	"Rabbit Hole"	Mike the Martyr	3:36
12.	"Fork In The Road"	Mike the Martyr	3:00
13.	"Rigamarole"	Mike the Martyr	2:31
14.	"Before The Storm"	Mike the Martyr	2:01
15.	"Outro"	Mike the Martyr	1:14
