= Who's Irish? =

1999 book by Gish Jen

First edition (publ. Knopf)

Who's Irish? is a short story collection written on June 4, 1999 by Gish Jen. It is also the name of one of the stories in the collection.

== Plot summary ==
The short story "Who's Irish?" is about an elderly Chinese woman and her mixed family living in New York. She begins talking about her granddaughter, Sophie, who is the daughter of John, who is Irish, and the narrator's daughter Natalie who is Chinese. The narrator tells of how wild her granddaughter is and makes various cultural distinctions calling Sophie "wild" and saying "millions of children in China, not one act like this." (Jen, 400). She also writes that her methods of discipline are not exactly embraced by her Irish son-in-law's family. The narrator argues that spanking is acceptable while her daughter encourages her to use her words (Jen, 401)

The main climax of the story takes place when the narrator takes Sophie to play in the park. Sophie learns from another kid, Sinbad, that it is ok to kick their parents. So Sophie kicks Sinbad's mother to which the narrator responds by spanking Sophie. Sophie then hides in a foxhole that Sinbad created and throws a clump of dirt onto her grandmother. The narrator is furious and tries to get Sophie to come out of the foxhole. She eventually grabs a stick and begins to poke at Sophie to see if she is still alive. Evening comes, as well as Natalie and John who are furious when they see the narrator poking at their daughter with a stick. John gets Sophie out but she is covered in bruises.

At the end of the story, Natalie convinces the narrator that she needs to move out. Bess, John's Mother, offers to let the narrator come stay with her. Natalie and John come and visit but they do not bring Sophie. Bess says they will in time. The story ends with the narrator reflecting on how she has become an honorary Irish.

== Critical reception ==
In The New York Times, Michiko Kakutani said that some stories are "weaker than others" though also stated that Jen had a "wonderful ear for the idiosyncrasies of American speech (and Chinese-American pidgin)".

In Salon, Jamie James said that "Jen has a deft way of turning stereotypes on their heads" but found the longer story, "House, House, "Home", to be "unnecessary".

Keith Phipps, in The A.V. Club, said that "Jen has the remarkable talent, possibly the most important for a writer of fiction, to make even the most specific situation universal."
