= World and Town =

2010 novel by Gish Jen

- Author: Gish Jen
- Language: English
- Publisher: Alfred A. Knopf
- Publication date: 2010
- Publication place: United States
- Pages: 386
- ISBN: 978-0-307-27219-5

World and Town is a novel by Gish Jen that follows a Chinese American widow and her friendship with a family of Cambodian immigrants. The novel describes the difficulties encountered in the lives of characters as they embrace immigration, rationalism, and religious fundamentalism.

Set in New England, the novel begins in early 2001 and describes the life of Hattie Kong, a widowed retired high school teacher. Kong's quiet life is interrupted when a family of Cambodian immigrants moves to her town. The family came to the United States as refugees from the Khmer Rouge. By the time that Kong meets them they are impoverished and racked by family conflicts and alcoholism. Kong soon develops a close friendship with the family's teenage daughter. The narrative concludes shortly after the September 11 attacks.

The daughter of a missionary, Kong prides herself on her liberalism and compassion and rejection of superstitious beliefs. Throughout the novel, she struggles with a dislike of the worldview embraced by other skeptics and a difficulty living in harmony with the beliefs of others.

The novel's point of view alternates between multiple characters, a technique praised by Donna Rifkind in her review of the book in The New York Times. Jen often employs Black humor throughout the book as she described the stress and suspicion of many characters.

In his review of the book in The Washington Post, Ron Charles praises Jen for combining different themes with "endearing finesse", but faults her treatment of fundamentalist Christianity as "cliche".
