= John T. Scott =

American painter (1940–2007)

- Born: June 30, 1940; New Orleans, Louisiana
- Died: September 1, 2007 (aged 67)
- Education: Xavier University of Louisiana (BA); Michigan State University (MFA)
- Known for: Woodcut, sculpture
- Awards: MacArthur Fellowship (1992)

John Tarrell Scott (June 30, 1940 – September 1, 2007) was an American sculptor, painter, printmaker, collagist, and MacArthur Fellow. The works of Scott meld abstraction with contemporary techniques infused with references to traditional African arts and Panafrican themes.

== Early life ==
Scott was born on a farm in Gentilly, a historic section of New Orleans, Louisiana. When he was 7 years old, his family moved to the Lower Ninth Ward. His father was a chauffeur and restaurant cook. Scott said his art training began at home where he learned embroidery from his mother. Scott was raised Catholic.

== Education and grants ==
After high school, he attended Xavier University of Louisiana in New Orleans and received a Bachelor of Arts degree. He received his Master of Fine Arts degree from Michigan State University in East Lansing, Michigan in 1965 where he studied under painter Charles Pollock. Afterwards, he returned to Xavier where he taught for 40 years. In 1983, Scott received a grant to study under the internationally renown sculptor George Rickey. In 1995, Scott received an honorary Doctor of Humanities from Michigan State University and a Doctor of Humanities from Tulane University in New Orleans in 1997. In 1992, he was awarded the exclusive MacArthur Grant (also known as the "Genius Grant") from the John D. and Catherine T. MacArthur Foundation. He used the money to build a larger studio.

== Works and commissions ==
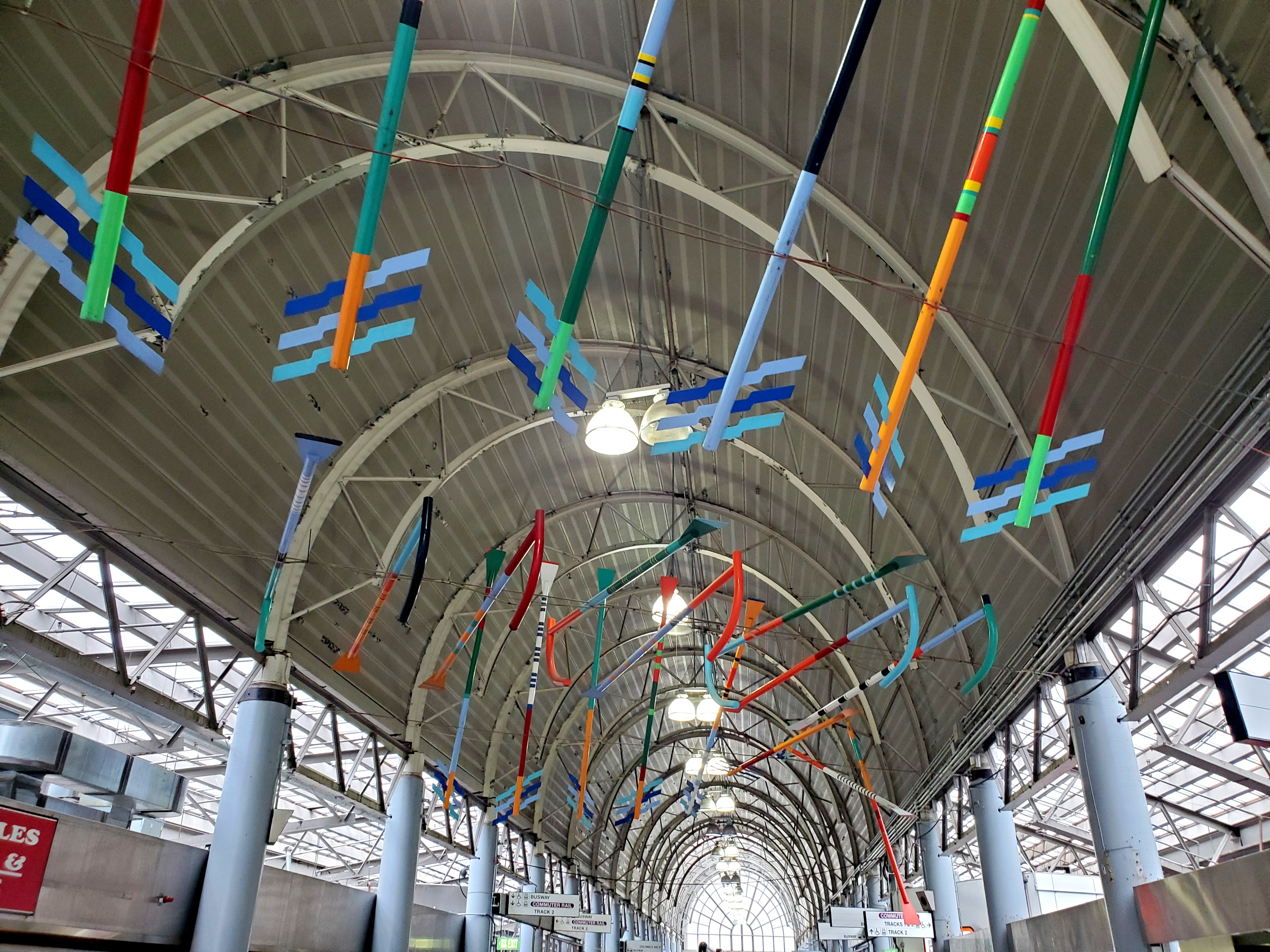
Stony Brook Dance, a 1989 work at Ruggles station in Boston, part of Arts in Transit

Scott is best known for creating large woodcut prints and for his African-Caribbean-New Orleans-inspired kinetic sculptures. In 2005, he was the subject of a major retrospective exhibit at the New Orleans Museum of Art entitled "Circle Dance: The Art of John T. Scott." Scott was also commissioned to create several pieces that are placed throughout the City of New Orleans. These public works in New Orleans include Spirit Gates at the New Orleans Museum of Art and Spirit House at DeSaix Circle (at St. Bernard and Gentilly Boulevards) in the Seventh Ward and River Spirit at Woldenberg Park along the Mississippi River near the Port of New Orleans. Scott had been quoted as saying that he tried to capture the musicality of New Orleans in the colors and rhythms of his sculptures.

== Themes ==
Scott's work frequently displayed themes related to African-American life, particularly the rich Afro-Caribbean culture and musical heritage of New Orleans. One of the best examples of this style is his sculpture called ''Ocean Song" located in Woldenberg Park (New Orleans). Scott said the rings at the top of the sculpture represented circle dances performed by slaves who frequented Congo Square. He is also known for his use of divergent materials in constructing his art, such as cast bronze, thin brass strips of wire and bent hardwood to create provocative sculptures.

== Collections ==
John T. Scott's works are exhibited in several permanent collections including:

- The Ogden Museum of Southern Art (New Orleans)
- The Louisiana State University Museum of Art in the Shaw Center for the Arts (Baton Rouge, Louisiana)
- The Amistad Research Center Collection at Tulane University (New Orleans)
- The Blanche and Norman C. Francis Collection at Xavier University of Louisiana (New Orleans)
- Loyola University (New Orleans)
- The Museum of Fine Arts (Houston, Texas)
- The Scripps College (Claremont, California)
- The Smithsonian American Art Museum (Washington D.C.)
- Fisk University (Nashville, Tennessee)
- Louisiana Endowment for the Humanities (New Orleans)
- Baltimore Museum of Art (Baltimore, MD)

== Death ==
Scott fled New Orleans just before Hurricane Katrina made landfall in August 2005 and settled in Houston, Texas. He died at Methodist Hospital in Houston after receiving two double-lung transplants and his long struggle with pulmonary fibrosis.

An exhibition called "Beyond Black" featuring Ed Clark, Eugene J. Martin and John T. Scott opened at the LSU Museum of Art, Shaw Center for the Arts, Baton Rouge, LA, on January 28 – May 8, 2011. The McKenna Museum of African-American Art in New Orleans hosted a tribute exhibition in fall 2014 as a Prospect.3+ satellite exhibition.

== See also ==
- Sculpting
- MacArthur Fellowship Recipients of 1992
- Xavier University of Louisiana
- Gentilly, New Orleans
- Ninth Ward of New Orleans
