= Ruth Whitman =

American poet

- Born: Ruth Bashein; May 28, 1922; New York City, New York
- Died: December 1, 1999 (aged 77); Rhode Island
- Occupations: Poet; Translator; Professor
- Notable work: Tamsen Donner: A Woman's Journey

Ruth Whitman (May 28, 1922 – December 1, 1999) was an American poet, translator, and professor.

== Career ==
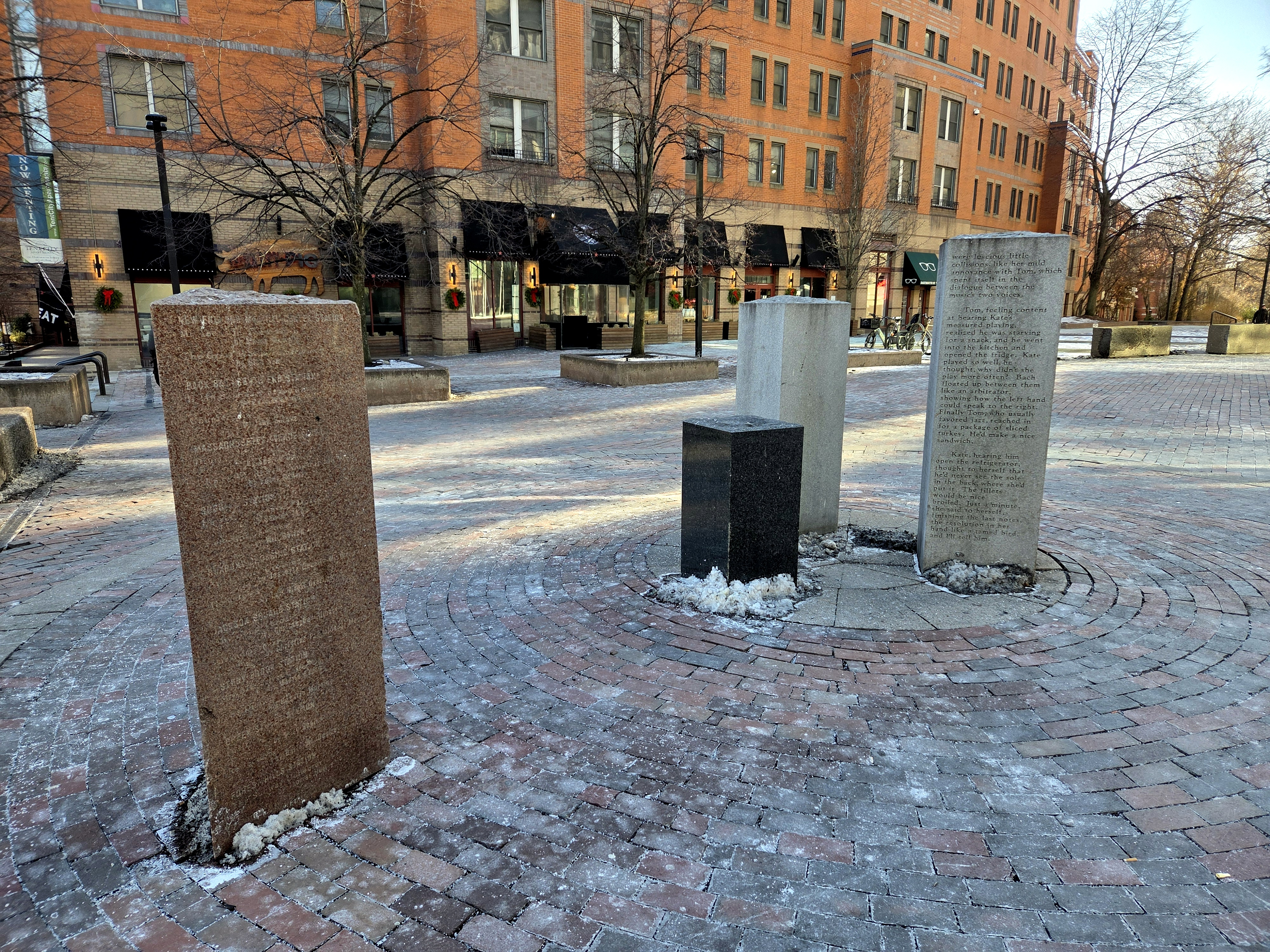
Engraved artworks outside Back Bay station in Boston, installed in the 1980s as part of the Arts in Transit program. Whitman's work "If My Boundary Stops Here" is at left.

Whitman received a B.A. and an M.A. from Radcliffe College, and also taught at Radcliffe, and at Massachusetts Institute of Technology.

The Collected Works of Ruth Whitman: Personas and Personhood (Wayne State University Press, 2026), edited by David Houghton, includes both published and unpublished poetry, and an updated text of Becoming a Poet. Her eighth and last book is Hatshepshut, Speak to me (Wayne State University Press, 1992), and her most well known work is Tamsen Donner: A Woman’s Journey.

She also translated poetry from Yiddish, and wrote the beloved poem Sisters.

Her honors and awards include a Senior Fulbright Writer-in-Residence Fellowship to Hebrew University of Jerusalem, a Bunting Institute Fellowship, and a National Endowment for the Arts Literature Fellowship. She won a 1969 National Jewish Book Award in the English Poetry category for The Marriage Wig and Other Poems.

Her poems were published in literary journals and magazines including AGNI and Ploughshares. She was an early cooperative member of Alice James Books, and was the poetry editor for Radcliffe Quarterly from 1980 - 1995.

Her papers are held at the Hollis Archives at Harvard Library.

== Personal life ==
The oldest daughter of Meyer David and Martha H. Bashein, né Sherman, Whitman was born on May 28, 1922, in New York City.

At the time of her death, she lived in Middletown, Rhode Island, and was married to Morton Sacks, a painter, and had three children, Rachel, Lee, and David.

Her first marriage was to Cedric Whitman and her second to Firman Houghton.

== Published works ==
Collected Works

- The Collected Works of Ruth Whitman: Personas and Personhood (Wayne State University Press, 2026, Edited by David Houghton)

Full-length Poetry Collections

- Hatshepshut, Speak to me (Wayne State University Press, 1992)
- Laughing Gas: Poems, New and Selected, 1963-1990 (Wayne State University Press, 1990)
- The testing of Hanna Senesh (Wayne State University Press, 1986, with a historical background by Livia Rothkirchen)
- Permanent Address (Alice James Books, 1980)
- Tamsen Donner: A Woman's Journey (Alice James Books, 1977)
- The Passion of Lizzie Borden (October House, 1973)
- The Marriage Wig and Other Poems (Harcourt, Brace & World, 1968)
- Blood & Milk Poems (Clarke & Way, 1963)

Translations

- The selected poems of Jacob Glatstein (October House, 1972)
- An anthology of modern Yiddish poetry (October House, 1966)

Non-fiction

- Becoming a Poet: Source, Process, Practice (The Writer, Inc., 1982)

== Sources ==
- Library of Congress Online Catalog > Ruth Whitman
