= Saturday in the Park (music festival) =

Music festival in Sioux City, Iowa

Coordinates: 42.516°N 96.409°W

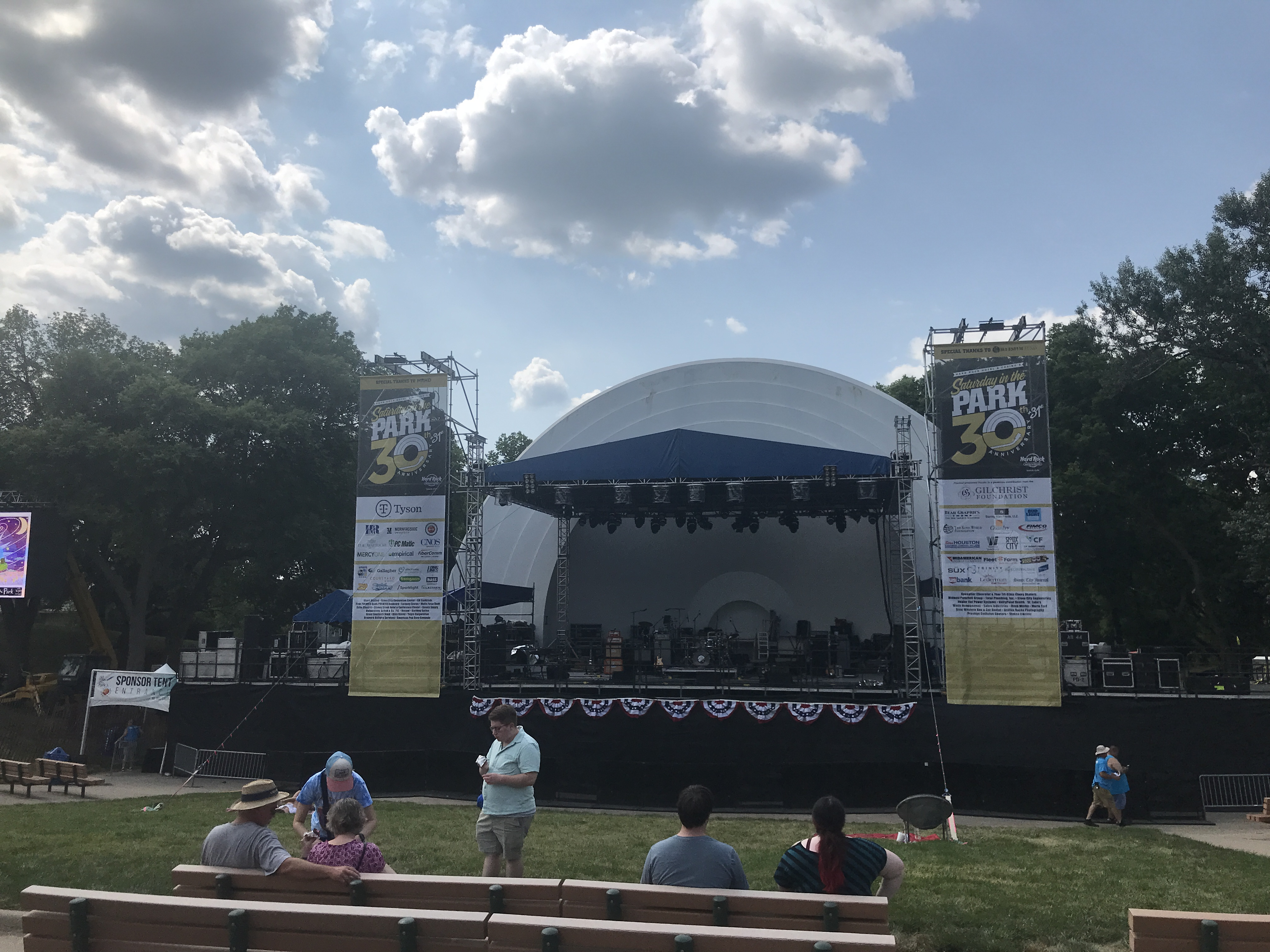
Grandview Park Bandshell during the 30th anniversary of Saturday in the Park.

Saturday in the Park is an annual festival that is held at Grandview Park Municipal Bandshell in Sioux City, Iowa first held in 1991. The festival falls on the Saturday closest to the 4th of July and attracts around 50,000 people from all over the Midwest for the weekend. The festival coincides with an annual pilgrimage of representatives from Sioux City's sister city, Lake Charles, Louisiana, adding a Mardi Gras-inflected Cajun accent.

== History ==
Saturday in the Park started in 1991 by Dave Bernstein and Adam Feiges to bring a concert to a park that "seemed it was completely underutilized." Since its inception in 1991, festival sponsors have included Chesterman Co. of Sioux City, Gateway Inc., and the Hard Rock Hotel & Casino Sioux City.

== The Music ==
Saturday in the Park is one of the premier festivals in the upper Midwest and is best known for its eclectic mixture of musical traditions. Live music acts are offered throughout the day at one of several stages located within the park. Saturday in the Park features both local and nationally known music talent from a variety of different music genres, with a special emphasis on American roots music such as blues, zydeco, and Cajun, along with other genres such as Ska.

Notable performers have included The Avett Brothers, AJR, Elle King, John Fogerty, Sublime With Rome, The Dirty Heads, Carlos Santana, Steve Winwood, Michael Franti, the Neville Brothers, B.B. King, Ziggy Marley, Dickey Betts and Great Southern, the Allman Brothers Band, Dr. John, Los Lobos, Bob Log III, Shemekia Copeland, Son Seals, Junior Brown, New Monsoon, Buddy Guy, Luther Allison, The Wallflowers, The Black Crowes, Counting Crows, Aretha Franklin, Foster the People, Blues Traveler, Manny Phesto, and Duenday.

In addition to the bandshell, the Abe Stage is located near the entrance to Grandview Park and offers live music during the festival. "This stage has traditionally been a home for local and underground alternative music acts, and has featured some big acts through the years. Bands such as Arrested Development, Brother Ali, Sir Mix A Lot, Atmosphere, Fishbone, Helmet and rappers Waka Flocka Flame and Fetty Wap have played the Second Stage."

== Other Attractions ==
Additionally, Saturday in the Park provides the opportunity to sample a wide variety of food from many Siouxland restaurants. BBQ and beer are favorites, along with ethnic Greek and Mexican food, and typical Midwestern carnival specialties, such as corn dogs and funnel cakes. Other attractions include carnival rides and games, a kids' stage, a shopping bazaar showcasing local artisans, fireworks (in some years), and more.

The festival is free to attend. Food and coolers are not allowed to be brought in, as purchases from vendors help fund the festival.
