= Melissa Shook =

American photographer (1939–2020)

- Born: April 18, 1939; New York, New York, U.S.
- Died: August 27, 2020 (aged 81); Chelsea, Massachusetts, U.S.
- Known for: Photography
- Website: melissashook.com

Melissa Shook (April 18, 1939 – August 27, 2020) was an American documentary photographer, artist and educator. Her work has been shown in group exhibitions at the Museum of Modern Art in New York, and is held in the collection there, as well as at the Center for Creative Photography, the Nelson-Atkins Museum of Art, and Moderna Museet in Stockholm.

== Life and work ==
Shook was born in New York City on April 18, 1939. She studied at Bard College and the Art Students League of New York. Shook taught at Massachusetts Institute of Technology's Creative Photo Lab in 1974, and at the University of Massachusetts Boston from 1975 to 2005. Her subjects included her daughter; a series of daily self-portraits; a shelter for homeless men and women; and a wheelchair basketball team.

She died in Chelsea, Massachusetts on August 27, 2020.

== Publications ==
- Streets are for Nobody: Homeless Women Speak. Boston: Boston Center for the Arts, 1991. With Jane Peterson.
- My Suffolk Downs. Pressed Wafer, 2012. ISBN 978-0975323762. Poetry and photography.
- He Says, She Says, I Say, and Nobody Tells the Truth, Whatever That Is, on the Backside of Suffolk Downs: a narrative by Melissa Shook. WordTech, 2014. ISBN 978-1625490797.
- Daily Self-Portraits 1972–1973. TBW Books, 2023. ISBN 978-1942953616.

== Group exhibitions ==
- Recent Acquisitions, 1974–1976, Museum of Modern Art, New York, 1976
- Pictures by Women: a History of Modern Photography, Museum of Modern Art, New York, 2010/11

== Collections ==
Shook's work is held in the following permanent collections:

- Center for Creative Photography, University of Arizona, Arizona: 83 prints (as of June 2016)
- International Center of Photography, New York: 1 print (as of April 2021)
- Light Work, Syracuse, New York: 8 prints (as of April 2021)
- Nelson-Atkins Museum of Art, Kansas City, MO: 208 prints (as of April 2021)
- Metropolitan Museum of Art, New York: 2 prints (as of April 2021)
- Moderna Museet, Stockholm, Sweden: numerous prints (as of 3 February 2025)
- Museum of Modern Art, New York: 37 prints (as of April 2021)
