= Manny Phesto =

Hip-Hop musician from Minneapolis, MN

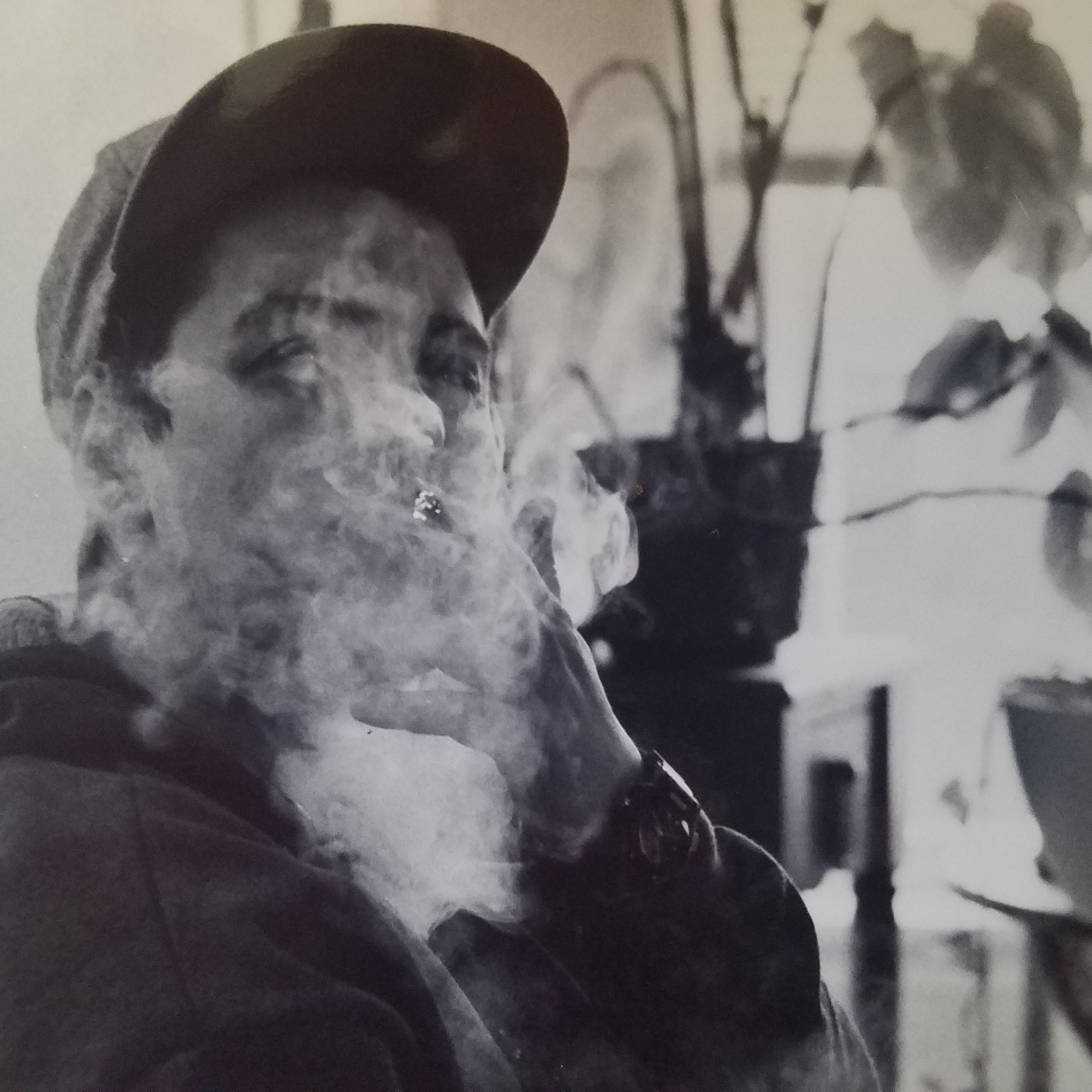
- Manny Phesto in Minneapolis, Minnesota

Background information
- Born: Manuel Levins Holden; September 22, 1989 (age 36); Minneapolis, Minnesota, United States
- Genres: Hip hop, alternative hip hop, underground hip hop
- Occupations: Rapper, Songwriter, Performer, Entrepreneur,
- Years active: 2010–present
- Label: Independent
- Website: www.mannyphesto.com

Manuel Levins Holden (born September 22, 1989), better known by his stage name Manny Phesto, is an underground hip hop musician, entrepreneur, and community advocate based in Minneapolis, Minnesota. His music has been recognized by Pitchfork Media, City Pages, and National Public Radio's The Current, which named his debut album Southside Looking In one of its Albums of the Year. In addition to his music career, he co-developed the cannabis brand Coughee with rapper Devin the Dude and co-founded the footwear company Scenic Society.

== Career ==
In 2010, Manny Phesto and a few friends began performing locally at demonstrations, benefit concerts, and small shows at parties and venues such as Acadia Café, and The Madusa. 2011 saw Manny curating his own events at local Italian restaurant Italiani's and playing other hip hop shows around town.

In September 2012, Manny Phesto co-founded and curated a day long hip hop festival in the Cedar Riverside neighborhood of Minneapolis at which he released his Social Capital EP collaboration with Julian Fairbanks. The festival, Hip Hop Harambee ran two consecutive years 2012, 2013 and featured local and national recording artists, dancers, visual artists, producers, and DJs including: Big K.R.I.T., Talib Kweli, Devin The Dude, Shabazz Palaces, Gritty Committee (Greg Grease & Freez), Mike the Martyr, Axel Foley, Metasota, DJ Frank Castle and others.

April 2014 Manny released his Mike the Martyr produced Southside Looking In project online, followed by a release party in June.

In May 2015 Manny Phesto was featured on the bill of the 8th annual Soundset Music Festival which was named the "Best Hip Hop Festival Around" by MTV". Manny was featured on Sway Calloway's Sway in the Morning show on Eminem's Shade 45 channel aired on Sirius XM.

In June 2015 and 2016, Manny Phesto toured four islands of Hawaii on The Intra Island Music Tour He performed at the 26th annual Saturday in the Park headlined by Aretha Franklin on July 4 in Sioux City, Iowa, and Summer Set Music and Camping Festival in Somerset, Wisconsin. Manny was named one of NoMute.MX's 11 recommendations for Festival Ajusco in Mexico City.

Manny Phesto is the co-founded and co-headlined the HiGH MiNDS Tour (2016), Back in Session (2017) and Breaking Even (2019) tours which toured the United States with fellow Minnesota artists Baby Shel and The Rotation, Cold Sweat, Jantzonia, Ben Buck and others. Manny Phesto has performed at Fabrica De Arte Cubano and Teatro Karl Marx in Havana, Cuba

In June 2019 Manny released his sophomore full length project Over South produced entirely by TZ1.

Since 2019, Phesto has released additional music and appeared as a featured artist on songs and projects by other musicians. Beyond music, he founded the creative collective Cloud Committee, co-developed the cannabis brand Coughee with rapper Devin the Dude, and co-founded the footwear company Scenic Society. In 2026, Scenic Society released its first sneaker, the 55406, inspired by South Minneapolis and its surrounding community.

Manny's upbringing in a working-class family of artists and activists including Ricardo Levins Morales, Richard Levins, Rosario Morales, and Aurora Levins Morales has influenced recurring themes in his music. He has worked with the Poor People's Economic Human Rights Campaign as a community organizer and was an official endorser of its directors 2012 bid for Vice President on the Green Party ticket.

== Marketing ==
During the 2014 midterm election he launched his "Manny Phesto for Minnesota" campaign in which he was "running" as a write-in candidate for any ballot position where his fans felt he was needed. Manny's yard signs appeared in yards throughout the twin cities. In the years since he has reintroduced the yard sign campaigns with "Manny Phesto for US", and most recently, "Manny Phesto for the People" in support of his Over South album with producer TZ1.

Manny has gathered "endorsement photos" from artists including Slug of Atmosphere, Immortal Technique, Mystikal, Rittz, Ghostface Killah, Action Bronson, and others. A couple of which were highlighted in this article by XXL. Manny has also adopted a Metro Transit (Minnesota) bus Shelter in Minneapolis.

== Discography ==
=== EPs ===
- (2012) Social Capital EP

=== Albums ===
- (2014) Southside Looking In
- (2019) Over South
