= Aurora Levins Morales =

Puerto Rican writer (born 1954)

- Born: February 24, 1954 (age 72); Maricao, Puerto Rico
- Education: Franconia College; Mills College; Union Institute & University
- Website: www.auroralevinsmorales.com www.littlevehicleforchange.org

Aurora Levins Morales (born February 24, 1954) is a Puerto Rican writer and poet. She is significant within Latina feminism and Third World feminism as well as other social justice movements.

== Biography ==
=== Early life and education ===
Levins Morales was born February 24, 1954, in Indiera Baja, a barrio of Maricao, Puerto Rico. Her mother, Rosario Morales, was a Harlem-born Puerto Rican writer. Her father, Richard Levins, who was Brooklyn-born and of Ukrainian-Jewish heritage, was an ecologist, population geneticist, and mathematical ecologist who researched diversity in human populations. Levins was John Rock Professor of Population Sciences and head of the Human Ecology program of the Department of Global Health and Population of the Harvard T.H. Chan School of Public Health in Boston, Massachusetts. He was a member of the US and Puerto Rican Communist Parties, the Movimiento Pro Independencia (the Independence movement in Puerto Rico), and the Puerto Rican Socialist Party, and he was on an FBI surveillance list.

Levins Morales became a public writer in the 1970s as a result of the many social justice movements of that time that addressed the importance of giving a voice to the oppressed. At age fifteen, she was the youngest member of the Chicago Women's Liberation Union and co-produced a feminist radio show, took part in sit-ins and demonstrations against the Vietnam War, guerrilla theater, women's consciousness raising groups, and door-to-door organizing for daycare and equal pay.

She attended Franconia College in Franconia, New Hampshire. Levins Morales also studied at Mills College in Oakland, California, and holds a Ph.D. in Women's Studies and History from Union Institute & University, a non-residential graduate school based in Cincinnati, Ohio.

=== Career ===
In 1976, she moved to the San Francisco Bay Area, where she worked at the KPFA Third World News Bureau, reporting on events in South Africa, the Philippines, Chile, Nicaragua and what was still Rhodesia, and on environmental racism, housing struggles, and the movement to get the US Navy to stop bombing Vieques, Puerto Rico.

Levins Morales became part of a radical US women of color writers movement that sought to integrate the struggles against sexism and racism. She began doing coffeehouse readings with other women, organizing poetry series, producing radio programs, publishing in literary journals and anthologies, and eventually becoming one of the contributors to This Bridge Called My Back, where she focuses on depicting the race, class, and gender issues that together shape Puerto Rican women's identities and historical experiences. Some of her major themes are feminism; multiple identity (Puerto Rican, Jewish, North American), immigrant experience, Jewish radicalism and history, Puerto Rican history, and the importance of collective memory, of history and art, in resisting oppression and creating social change.

From 1979 to 1981, Levins Morales worked as co-founder, scriptwriter, and performer for La Peña Cultural Productions Group. The group created multimedia productions around the theme of Latin American politics and culture as a form of political activism. In 1986, Levins Morales and her mother wrote Getting Home Alive, a collection of poetry and prose about their lives as US Puerto Rican women. Unfortunately, after the publication of this collection, Morales sustained a brain injury in a car accident. This accident set Morales back for a year, with struggles in performing daily tasks. Levins Morales went to graduate school to become a historian. While her dissertation focused on retelling the history of the Atlantic world with Puerto Rican women's lives at the center, she also did extensive research on the history of Puerto Ricans in California, collecting several dozen oral histories, and preserving early documents of the San Francisco Puerto Rican community. From 1999 to 2002, she worked at the Oakland Museum of California as lead historian for the Latino Community History Project, working with high school students to collect oral histories and photographs, and create artwork and curriculum materials based on them.

In her collection of essays Medicine Stories: History, Culture, and the Politics of Integrity (1998), Levins Morales questions traditional accounts of American history and their consistent exclusion of people of color. She argues that traditional historical narratives have had devastating effects on those it has silenced, and oppressed. In an attempt to “heal” this historical trauma of oppression, she designs a “medicinal” history that gives centrality to the marginalized, particularly Puerto Rican women. Levins Morales strives to make visible those who have been absent from history books while also emphasizing resistance efforts.

In her book, Remedios: Stories of Earth and Iron from the History of Puertorriqueñas (1998), her goal is "to unearth the names of women deemed unimportant by the writers of official histories”(Levins Morales, p. xvii). Short pieces interspersed throughout the narratives describe medicinal herbs and foods that symbolize the healing properties of the narratives that follow those sections. In this manner she treats historical erasure as a disease that a curandera historian can heal through “home-grown” herbal history.

Levins Morales is one of the 18 Latina feminist women who participated in the gatherings of the Latina Feminist Group, which culminated with the publication of Telling to Live: Latina Feminist Testimonios in 2001.

In 2013, she self-published Kindling: Writings On the Body through her own Palabrera Press. This was followed in 2014 by Cosecha and Other Stories collecting memoir and short fiction by Levins Morales and her mother. In 2015 she signed a contract with Duke University Press for a new edition of Medicine Stories, subtitled Essays for Radicals which was released in April, 2019 with twelve new and nine substantially revised essays. In August 2019, she published a collection of prose poems entitled Silt, about the Mississippi River and the Caribbean Sea, exploring their natural and social landscapes.

She is a member of the advisory board of Jewish Voice for Peace and is active in the organization's Jews of Color Caucus. She is a contributing editor of Unruly.org, the online publication of the caucus.

==== Disability and health activism ====
Levins Morales lives with multiple disabilities and chronic illnesses, including epilepsy, several brain injuries, fibromyalgia, chronic fatigue and Environmental Illness (also known as Multiple Chemical Sensitivities.) In 2007 she had a stroke and began using a wheelchair, which allowed her to become part of the disability arts community in the Bay Area. In 2009 she became a commissioned artist with Sins Invalid, a disabled artists' performance project that "explores the themes of sexuality, embodiment and the disabled body" and centers disabled artists of color and gender variant disabled artists. She was also a commissioned artist in 2011, and appears briefly in the film Sins Invalid.

In 2009, she traveled to Cuba for medical care, and received two month-long cycles of treatment at the Centro Internacional de Restauración Neurológica in Havana, as a result of which she no longer uses a wheelchair. In 2010, she was forced to leave her home because of environmental issues, and began designing a non-toxic mobile home, which she named the Vehicle for Change.

Since late 2019, Levins Morales has lived in Maricao, Puerto Rico.

Levins Morales is active in the emerging Disability Justice movement and speaks and writes about the politics of disability.

=== Personal and family life ===
After her mother, Rosario, died in 2011, Aurora Levins Morales moved in with her father in his Cambridge, Massachusetts, home.

She has two brothers, Ricardo and Alejandro. Ricardo Levins Morales is a poster artist and organizer in Minneapolis. Alejandro Levins is an entrepreneur in Western Massachusetts.

Her brother Ricardo's son, Manny Phesto, is a Minneapolis-based hip-hop artist.

Aurora Levins Morales has a daughter, Alicia Raquel Morales, who was born in 1988. Alicia is a genderqueer Boricua dancer and artist who grew up in the Bay Area, with roots in Puerto Rico, and is now based in Brooklyn. She has performed under various names, including Alicia Raquel Otis Levins Morales and Alicia Bauman Morales. Levins Morales has publicly referred to and dedicated her work to her daughter.

== Published works ==
- Getting Home Alive with Rosario Morales (Firebrand Books, 1986). ISBN 0-932379-20-6
- Medicine Stories: History, Culture, and the Politics of Integrity (South End Press, 1998). ISBN 0-89608-582-1
- Remedios: Stories of Earth and Iron from the History of Puertorriqueñas (Beacon Press, 1998). ISBN 0-8070-6516-1
- Kindling: Writings On the Body (Palabrera Press, 2013). ISBN 978-0-9836831-3-1
- Cosecha and Other Stories with Rosario Morales (Palabrera Press, 2014). ISBN 978-0-9836831-1-7
- Medicine Stories: Essays for Radicals (Duke University Press, 2019). ISBN 978-1-4780-0309-0
- Silt: Prose Poems (Palabrera Press, 2019). ISBN 978-0-9836831-2-4
- Rimonim: Ritual Poetry of Jewish Liberation (Ayin Press, 2024). ISBN 978-1-961814-17-2
- The Story of What Is Broken Is Whole: An Aurora Levins Morales Reader (Duke University Press, 2024). ISBN 978-1-4780-3093-5

== See also ==
- List of Puerto Rican writers
- List of Puerto Ricans
- Puerto Rican literature
- Jewish immigration to Puerto Rico
- List of Jewish American poets
