= Jack Lueders-Booth =

American photographer (born 1935)

- Born: John Edward Cuneo; June 3, 1935 (age 91); Boston, MA
- Education: Harvard University, Ed.M., 1978
- Occupation: Photographer
- Employer: self
- Style: Documentary
- Website: www.jacklueders-booth.com

Jack Lueders-Booth (born John Cuneo, June 3, 1935) is an American photographer. He retired from teaching at Harvard in 2000, and continues to live and work in the Boston area.

== Early life ==
Lueders-Booth was born in Boston, MA on June 3, 1935. His father, Edward J. Booth, was a math professor and his mother, Marie G. Booth, a homemaker. Lueders-Booth is the oldest of six children, four girls and two boys. He was raised Catholic.

Lueders-Booth has lived in Boston, Ma. his entire life. After graduating high school, He began studying English at Harvard. Booth never finished his undergraduate degree, and instead began working for an insurance company, where he stayed for 15 years. Booth's interest in photography began when he was a young child, though this did not become a serious interest until he was 25.

== Career ==
=== Teaching career ===
A self-taught documentary photographer, Jack Lueders-Booth left an office management company with Combined Insurance Company of America in 1970, at the age of 35, to pursue overriding interests in photography. Booth went to work for Harvard University as the manager of their photography teaching laboratory, and a year later began to also teach photography there.

In 1976, Booth took on a part-time study at Harvard’s Graduate School of Education, which he designed to be a photographic education, and he received his master's degree in 1978. He worked as a photography instructor in Harvard University’s Extension and Summer School’s until 1999. Booth also taught at The Maine Photographic Workshop, teaching both beginning and advanced documentary seminars. He served as a guest critic and lecturer at The Art Institute of Boston, Boston University, University of Colorado Boulder, Dartmouth College, Emerson College, The Maine Photographic Workshops, Massachusetts College of Art and Design, School of the Museum of Fine Arts, Tufts University, and Yale Graduate School of Art. In 1989, Booth was appointed Artist-in-Residence at Dartmouth College, and in 1983-84 he was guest Artist-Teacher at the Danforth Museum in Framingham, Ma. From 1983-1995, Booth received twelve Commendations for Distinguished Teaching, and three nominations for Harvard University’s Joseph P. Levenson Prize for Best Teacher of the Year.

In 2000, Booth semi-retired to adjunct faculty positions at (sequentially), The School of The Museum of Fine Arts in Boston, The Rhode Island School of Design, The Massachusetts College of Art, The Art Institute of Boston, and Lesley University College of Art and Design.

=== Photography ===
While working a full-time teaching schedule, Lueders-Booth pursued documentary projects at every opportunity. These included Chronic Disease and Custodial Patients - supported in part by a Harvard University Work Completion Grant from 1970-1973; The Salvation Army from 1974-1975; Camping Families in 1976; and Patmos, Greece in 1977. Booth photographed Women Prisoners, supported in part by fellowships from the NEA, Massachusetts Council on the Arts and Humanities, The ‘Artists’ Foundation, and the Polaroid Foundation. Booth photographed the American Motorcycling Community and Culture from 1985–present. He also photographed Neighborhoods of the Orange Line, a branch of Boston’s public transportation system which runs through strongly segregated neighborhoods. This project was commissioned by Urbanarts and supported in total by group project grants from the Boston Arts Lottery, the Boston Globe Foundation, and the Rowland Foundation, and a personal grant from the Maine Photographic Workshops (1985-1987). Booth worked on a series of Cambridge Families Before gentrification, supported by a grant from the Cambridge Arts Council in 1987; of Lowell Folklife, a personal commission from the U.S. Library of Congress to work as photographer with oral historians conducting a contemporary and historical social study of Lowell, Ma., its traces to nineteenth century mill culture, and the recent influx of Southeast Asians fleeing the turmoil in their homelands from 1987-1988; Cambodians in New England, a personal continuation of the Library of Congress commission for The Addison Gallery of American Art’s exhibition Shifting Cultures from 1990-1991; and Families who live in and off of the Dumps of Tijuana from 1991-1998. Booth also received a Humanitarian Award from The Pine Street Inn, a Boston homeless shelter, for volunteer fund-raising photography.

=== 2000-present ===
After leaving his teaching position at Harvard University, Booth pursued his interest in photography full-time. From 2000-2006, Booth worked on the series The Last Corner Store, a shop near Central Square in Cambridge, Massachusetts. Since 2005, Booth has photographed in and around Central Square, as well as at The Cantab and The Cantabridgean Lounge. This work has yet to be published.

== Personal life ==
Booth has six adult children, Douglass (B.1957), Laura (B.1959), Gregory (B.1960), Peter (B.1968), Lucy Nguyen (B.1980), and Evie Lueders-Booth (B.1991). For fun, he plays darts, tennis, and races motorcycles. Booth lives in Cambridge, Massachusetts.

== Work and awards ==
=== Selected collections ===
- Addison Gallery of American Art, Andover, Massachusetts
- Art Institute of Chicago, Chicago, Illinois
- DeCordova Museum and Sculpture Park, Lincoln, Massachusetts
- Fogg Museum at Harvard University, Cambridge, Massachusetts
- Hood Museum of Art at Dartmouth College, Hanover, New Hampshire
- Library of Congress, Washington, District of Columbia
- Museum of Contemporary Photography at Columbia College Chicago, Chicago, Illinois
- Museum of Modern Art, New York, New York
- Museum of Photographic Arts, San Diego, California
- San Francisco Museum of Modern Art, San Francisco, California
- Smithsonian Institution, Washington, District of Columbia

=== Selected exhibitions ===
- An Elevated View: The Orange Line at Boston Public Library, Boston, Massachusetts, 1988, 2016
- The Smithsonian (2012) (group "American Prisons")
- The Small Works Show, Sacramento Gallery, Cambridge, Massachusetts October 23 - December 4, 2009
- “Lueders-Booth Tuckerman” at The Art Institute of Boston, Boston, Massachusetts, 2005
- Our Town, The Burden Gallery, Aperture Foundation, NYC, 1993 (group)
- Families Who Live In and Off of the Dumps of Tijuana, The Carpenter Center for Visual Arts at Harvard University, Cambridge, Massachusetts, 1994 (one person)
- Photography Now, The Columbia College of Photography, Chicago Illinois, 1980 (group)
- Families Who Live In and Off of the Dumps of Tijuana, The David Rockefeller Center for Latin American Studies at Harvard University, Cambridge, Massachusetts 1996 (one person)
- John Lueders-Booth: Artist in Residence, The Hopkins Center of Art at Dartmouth College, Hanover, New Hampshire, 1989 (one person)
- Boston Now, The Institute of Contemporary Art, Boston, Massachusetts, 1980 (group)
- Families Who Live In and Off of the Dumps of Tijuana, The Maine Photographic Workshops, 1998 (one person)
- Women Prisoners, Marion Art Center, Marion Massachusetts, 1980 (one person)
- Families Who Live In and Off of the Dumps of Tijuana, The Massachusetts College of Art, 2006 (one person)
- Recent Acquisitions (with Robert Frank), The Museum of Modern Art, NYC, 1988 (group)
- Women Prisoners, Northeastern University, Boston, Massachusetts, 1989 (one person)
- Families Who Live In and Off of the Dumps of Tijuana, The Rhode Island School of Design, 2003 (one person)
- Crossing the Frontier, The San Francisco Museum of Modern Art, San Francisco, California, 1996 (group)
- The Library of Congress Lowell Folklife Project, The United States Senate Rotunda, Washington, District of Columbia, 1994 (one person)
- Families Who Live In and Off of the Dumps of Tijuana, The University of Colorado at Boulder, Boulder, Colorado, 1995 (one person)

=== Selected grants, fellowships, and awards ===
- American Photography: Best Books of 2005
- The Artists Foundation, Massachusetts (2)
- Lucie Award
- Bookbuilders of Boston
- The Massachusetts Council for The Arts and Humanities (3)
- The Maine Photographic Workshops
- The National Endowment for the Arts
- The National Endowment for The Humanities
- Humanitarian Award, Pine Street Inn, Homeless Shelter (volunteer photography)
- The Polaroid Foundation (2)
- Urban Arts/Rowland Foundation
- Nominated twice with Luis Alberto Urrea for The Dorothea Lange, Paul Taylor Prize, Duke University Center for Documentary Studies.

== Publications ==
Books

- American Motorcycling Culture Published by STANLEY BARKER Books, 2025.
- Women Prisoner Polaroids Published by STANLEY BARKER Books, 2024.
- The Orange Line Published by STANLEY BARKER Books, 2022.
- Inherit the Land (awarded monograph [5] with introduction by Luis Alberto Urrea and Afterword by Frank Gohlke)
- Across the Wire (with Luis Alberto Urrea)
- By The Lake of Sleeping Children (with Luis Alberto Urrea)
- John Lueders-Booth, Artist in Residence, Dartmouth College, Hanover NH (exhibition catalogue, 1989)
- New American Photography (exhibition catalog)
- Photojournalism 1997 (best of), Graphis Press

Other Selected Publications

- American Photography Periodical
- DoubleTake, The Center for Documentary Studies at Duke University
- Selected Photographs from The Library of Congress American Folklife Center
- Weddings, National Endowment for the Arts
- New American Photography produced by Columbia College for the exhibition at the Chicago Center for Contemporary Photography
- The article The Artist's Lens: A Focus on Relocation produced by the Photographic Resource Center at Boston University in their quarterly publication "Views."
- The article John Lueders-Booth: Inside Stories published in Aperture's Quarterly Summer Vol. 91
- The article Like Silk written by Marianne Wiggins and published in Aperture's Quarterly Spring Vol. 127
- Across the Wire: Life and Hard Times on the Mexican Border written by Luis Alberto Urrea
- Thoughts on Landscape: Collected Writings and Interviews written by Frank Gohlke
- The Best Books of the Year written by David Schonauer
- Lueders-Booth & Tuckerman @ The Art Institute of Boston written by Matthew Nash
