= Rosario Morales =

Puerto Rican writer and poet

- Born: August 23, 1930 New York City, New York
- Died: March 23, 2011 (aged 80)
- Education: Hunter College; Cornell University; University of Puerto Rico; University of Michigan; University of Chicago
- Spouse: Richard Levins
- Children: Aurora Levins Morales, Ricardo Levins Morales, Alejandro Levins

Rosario Morales (August 23, 1930 – March 23, 2011) was a Puerto Rican author and poet. She is best known for her book Getting Home Alive which she co-authored with her daughter Aurora Levins Morales in 1986. She was also significant within the Latina feminist movement and the Communist Party. She describes her own complicated identity in her poem "I am what I am", “I am Puerto Rican I am U.S. American… I am Boricua as Boricuas come… I am naturalized Jewish American… I am what I am. Take it or leave me alone."

== Biography ==
=== Early life and childhood ===
Rosario Morales was born in August 1930 to two immigrants from Naranjito, Puerto Rico, both from landholding families. Her mother worked in a hospital laundry, and later in a garment factory. Her father was a janitor and then an electrician. She was raised Catholic, and, although the family was not very devout, Rosario was very firm in her religious beliefs and even considered becoming a nun early in her life, although this religious fervor diminished over time. She grew up in El Barrio of New York City at a time when the Puerto Rican population was still very small. There were only 52,774 first-generation Puerto Ricans in the US in 1930. This profoundly impacted her identity; she learned to identify with other minority groups such as her Eastern European Jewish neighbors. The Morales family spoke Spanish at home until the children entered primary school. Once in English-speaking public school, Rosario and her sister began to primarily speak English, because it was the language they used for the longest parts of their day.

Rosario's father was very controlling and fought often with her mother during their childhood. Due to this conflict, she says she would not describe her relationship with her parents at this point in her life as close. Her younger sister used to urge them to divorce after the fights. They did so briefly when Rosario was in her late 30s, but remarried soon after. Her father was diagnosed with dementia soon after her parents returned to live in Puerto Rico.

Morales attended public school in New York City, which she cites as the time when English transitioned to being her primary language. The family began to speak what Rosario defines as Inglañol rather than Spanglish, because Spanglish is Spanish that uses English words, whereas they spoke English that incorporated Spanish words. Her primary school is where she first discovered her passion for writing.

As a young adult, Rosario had a complicated relationship with her Puerto Rican heritage. She felt a strong kinship with the land and nature of the island, as described in her poem “Happiness as a Coquí”, but was also adamant that the United States is her home. She describes her feelings in her work “Puerto Rican Journal”: “This is not home eleven years couldn’t make it home. I’ll always be clumsy with the language always resentful of the efforts to remake me.”

=== Adult life ===
While studying at Hunter College in New York, she met Ukrainian heritage Jew Richard Levins, also known as Dick, through mutual friends and her political activism. Within two weeks of meeting, the two decided to become informally engaged. They waited several months before breaking the news to their families due to a fear of being seen as too young for marriage. In 1950, at 19 and 20 years-of-age, they were married.

In 1951, Rosario moved with Dick to Puerto Rico. He had recently graduated and was trying to avoid the draft for the Korean War. While in Puerto Rico, the two became active in the Puerto Rican Communist Party and the Fellowship of Reconciliation while working a small farm in the mountains.

They had their first child, Aurora Levins Morales in 1954. Rosario and Aurora both became public writers as participants in the Second Wave of U.S. feminism. Although they had a sometimes challenging personal relationship, Rosario cites her daughter as her closest ally in her work surrounding Latina Feminism.

Rosario and Dick's second child, Ricardo Manuel, was born in 1956. Shortly thereafter, Rosario and Dick moved to New York City while Dick pursued graduate studies at Columbia University, and Rosario studied at City College. She was an accomplished visual artist in multiple genres, an interest she shared with her son, Ricardo, who is a well-known activist artist. During this time she also met anthropologist Anthony Leeds, part of a group of young radical social scientists, and became interested in the field.

In 1961, the family returned to Puerto Rico, where Dick joined the faculty of the University of Puerto Rico. Rosario pursued her interests in visual art and women's crafts, and began studying anthropology on her own, and during summers at the University of Michigan. Rosario and Dick's third child, Alejandro Rubén, was born in 1965, during an anti-war teach-in at the University of Puerto Rico, in which Dick played a leading role. Dick drove back and forth between the teach-in and the hospital during Rosario's labor.

In 1967, Dick was denied tenure at the University of Puerto Rico because of his political activism. Rosario wanted to go to graduate school in anthropology, and was concerned about the role models available to her daughter in rural Puerto Rico, so they decided to leave.

They moved to Chicago in June, 1967, and Rosario started graduate school at the University of Chicago. Within the first weeks of the semester, the students went on strike to protest the fact that many of the anthropology faculty were away doing field work, and few classes were being offered, and Rosario found herself in a leadership role in campus activism. Her prose poem "Concepts of Pollution" in Getting Home Alive describes her experience with the racism of anthropology. Her Masters thesis was a critique of the racism of French anthropologist Claude Levi-Straus, entitled "Tropes Tipique," a satirical play on his famous work, Tristes Tropiques.

Morales and her daughter Aurora became active in the women's movement in the late 1960s through their membership in the Chicago Women's Liberation Union. In 1975, Rosario and Dick moved to Cambridge, Massachusetts, where Dick joined the faculty of the Harvard School of Public Health. Rosario loved New England and it became the place she felt most at home. The couple also had a cabin in Marlboro, Vermont, where they spent summers.

In 1981, Rosario and Aurora were both contributors to This Bridge Called My Back: Writings by Radical Women of Color edited by Cher'rie Moraga and Gloria Anzaldúa. In 1983, they were approached by Nancy Bereano, a feminist editor, soon to be founder of Firebrand Books, who invited them to submit a joint manuscript. Getting Home Alive was published in 1986.

In 1995, she took a leadership role with the Women's Community Cancer Project partially due to her own health decline, but also as an attempt to revitalize her old interest in a more scientific field.

An artist and intellectual with wide-ranging interests, Rosario Morales studied botany, philosophy of science, feminist history and political writings, and fiber arts.

Rosario Morales was diagnosed with multiple myeloma in 2002. On February 28, 2011, she decided to stop her treatment. On March 23, 2011, Rosario Morales died at 3:30 am. She is survived by her husband, her sister Gloria, her three children and five grandchildren, including Minneapolis-based hip hop artist Manny Phesto.

== Career ==
=== Involvement in the Communist Party ===
During her schooling at Hunter College, Rosario began to lose faith in her religious beliefs. She cites this as one of the reasons she became so deeply involved in the Communist Party: it gave her something new in which to put her faith and passion.

She first discovered her interest in socialist ideology when two of her close friends in college enrolled her a course at the Jefferson School – a program run by the Communist Party. She fell in love with the philosophy she learned there.

In addition, it was through her new activism and friends that she met Dick Levins. Together, they joined the Communist Party on July 29, 1949. One of their early dates was the so-called Peekskill Riots, in which white supremacists tried to prevent a concert by Paul Robeson in Peekskill, New York.

After their move to Puerto Rico, both Rosario and Dick became members of the Puerto Rican Communist Party (1951–1956). Their involvement in communist activism at this time decreased due to the small size of the Puerto Rican Communist Party and its structure. The party in Puerto Rico was run by a very small core group, in which the participation of women was uncommon and discouraged. Rosario and Dick became close friends with César Andreu Iglesias, a prominent labor leader and journalist, who was in the leadership of the Party, and his wife, Jane Speed, an Alabama communist organizer.

In 1956, Jane attempted to get a leadership position within the party and, subsequently, was forced out of involvement. Both couples left the Communist Party, partially due to this incident, and also because of their disapproval of the factions forming within party leadership.

=== Writing ===
Rosario Morales's two most recognized publications are Getting Home Alive and her contributions to This Bridge Called My Back. In addition, Rosario says in her interviews that the pieces of writing she is the most proud of are her writings in This Bridge Called My Back and her piece “Concepts of Pollution” in Getting Home Alive. Both share a focus on the themes of personal identity, multiple consciousness, critical reflections on gender relations, and social commentary. She fuses her identities as a U.S. Latina who grew up among Eastern European Jews, and married one, through language; her poetry combines English, Spanish, and Yiddish.

This Bridge Called My Back is an anthology collected and edited by Cherríe Moraga and Gloria E. Anzaldúa and first published in 1981. It is an examination of Feminist politics among women of color in the United States. Working and connecting with women from different racial and ethnic backgrounds that shared her passions gave Morales a new perspective on the world. Her contributions to the anthology discuss identity as multiple and complementary rather than restrictive.

In 1986, Morales published Getting Home Alive, a collection of writings and poems that she collaborated on with her daughter Aurora Levins Morales. The book is an analysis of multiple identity as multiple as can be seen in the much anthologized “Ending Poem”, the final piece in Getting Home Alive. It explores their relationship with Puerto Rico in poems such as "Happiness is a Coquí", “Nostalgia”, and “Memory”. These poems both admire the beauty of the island and its traditions, as well as critique the patriarchal dominance in Puerto Rican society. Additionally, it explores Rosario and Aurora's differing emotions toward the United States and their heritage as mother and daughter.

Rosario Morales' literary papers are held at Smith College Special Collections. The collection includes "correspondence, writings (manuscripts, drafts, journals, free writing, publications), conference files, memorabilia, and awards that document her personal and professional life as an author, poet, feminist, and activist. The materials in this collection primarily date back to the 1980s and 1990s, and are especially reflective of Rosario Morales' processes as a writer. Writings included here are primarily autobiographical, focusing on her identity as a Puerto Rican feminist. Morales' writings often underscore the importance of intersectionality in the feminist movement. Other topics covered include communism/Marxism, writing and publishing processes, Cuba and the Cuban blockade, and feminist theory. Of note is correspondence with Gloria Anzaldua and Cherrie Moraga, the editors of the 1981 anthology This Bridge Called My Back, including notes on public readings and publicity for the groundbreaking book by and about women of color. The papers also include some materials of her daughter, writer Aurora Levins Morales."

== Later life ==
Rosario stopped writing publicly and publishing before she died; she wanted to write because she had something poignant to say rather than because she thought of herself as a writer. Instead, she began to read a lot and took a bigger role in editing her husband's work on communism in Puerto Rico and Cuba. On March 23, 2011, Morales succumbed to her multiple myeloma at home in Massachusetts.

== Published works ==
- This Bridge Called My Back: Writings by Radical Women of Color, contributor (Persephone Press, 1981; Kitchen Table: Women of Color Press, 1983). ISBN 9780913175033
- Getting Home Alive, coauthor with Aurora Levins Morales (Firebrand Books, 1986). ISBN 0932379206

== See also ==
- List of Puerto Rican writers
- List of Puerto Ricans
- Puerto Rican literature
- Jewish immigration to Puerto Rico
