= Pan-American Conference of Women =

20th-century women's conference

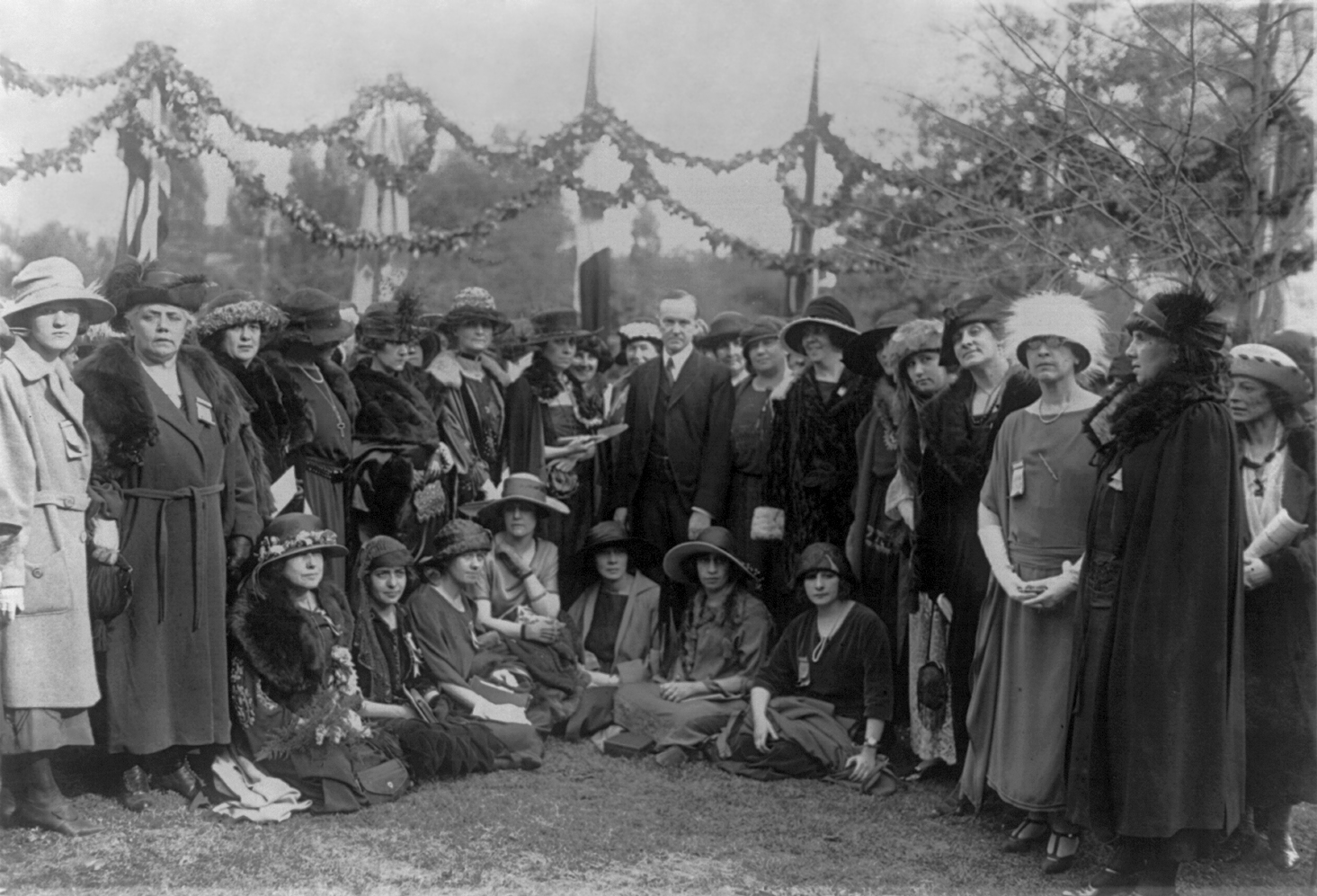
Group at the International Tree Planting, with women from 21 nations who are attending the Pan-American Conference of Women. in the center of the group are Antoinette Carter Hughes, wife of the US Secretary of State, Grace Coolidge and Vice President Calvin Coolidge.

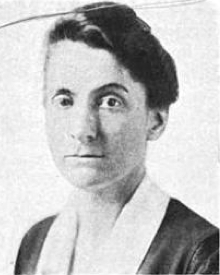
Grace Abbott

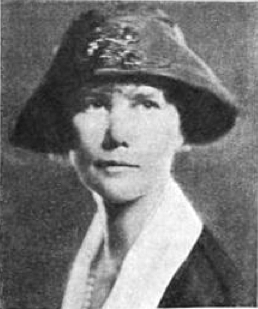
Julia Abbott

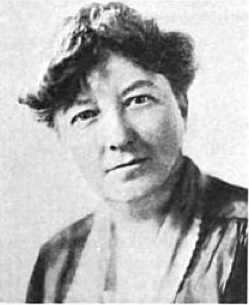
Mary Anderson

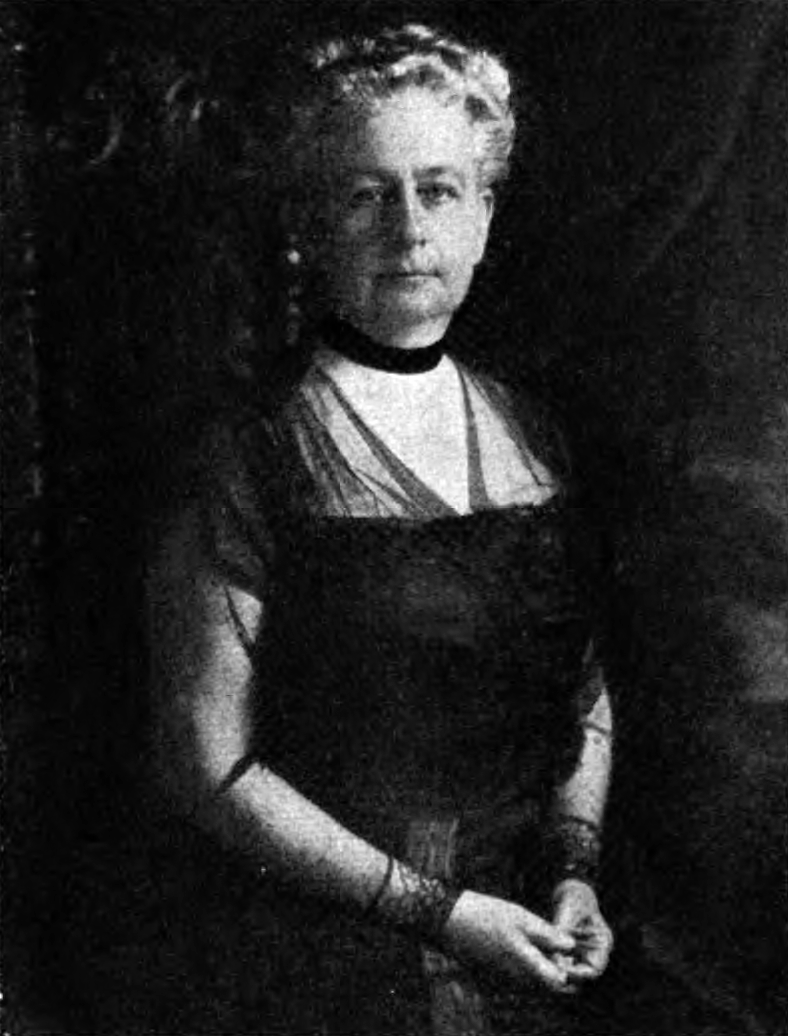
Louise DeKoven Bowen

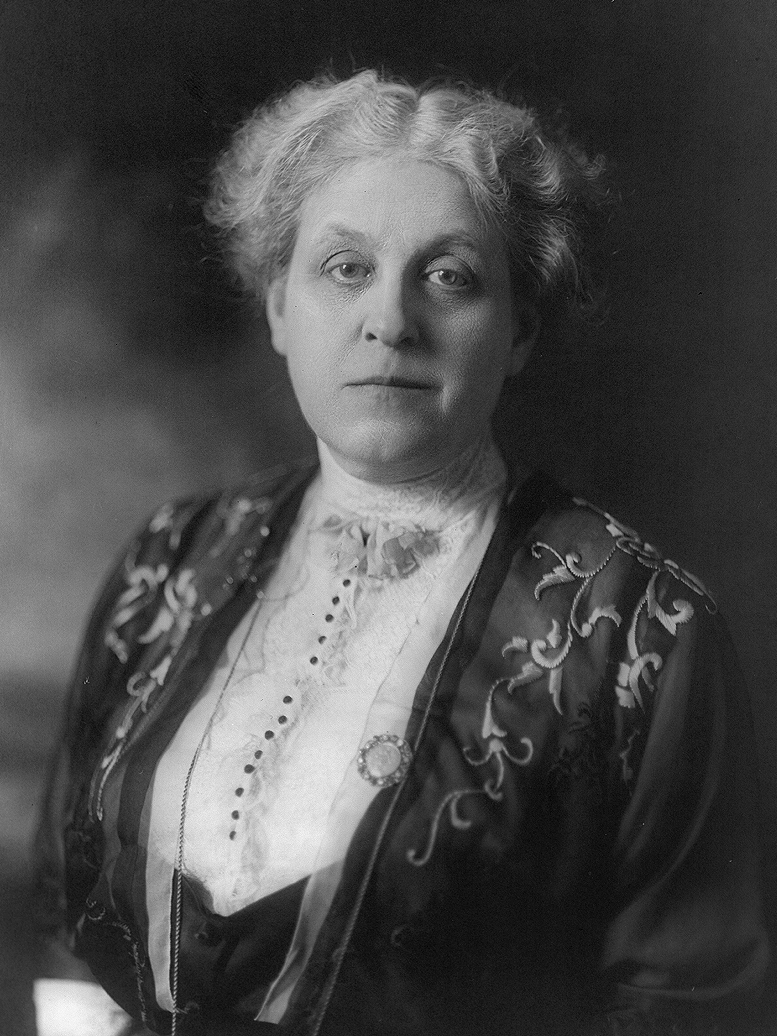
Carrie Chapman Catt

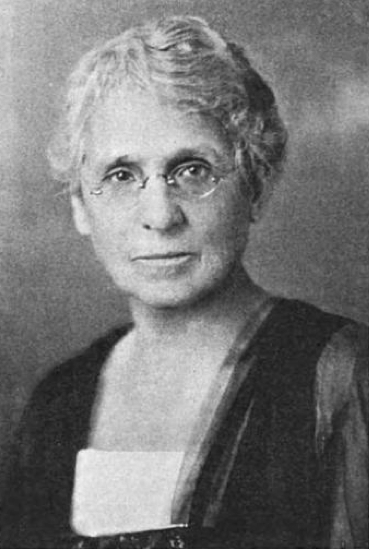
Madeleine Lemoyne Ellicott

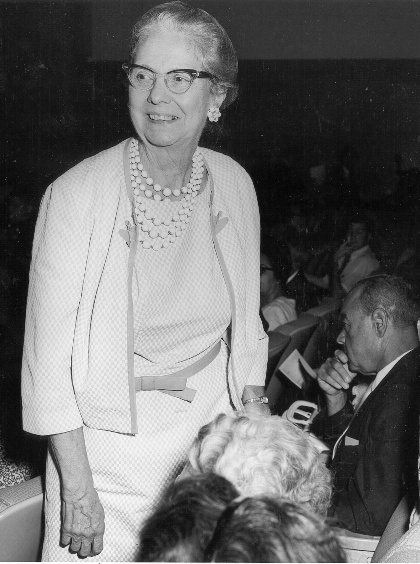
Lavinia Engle

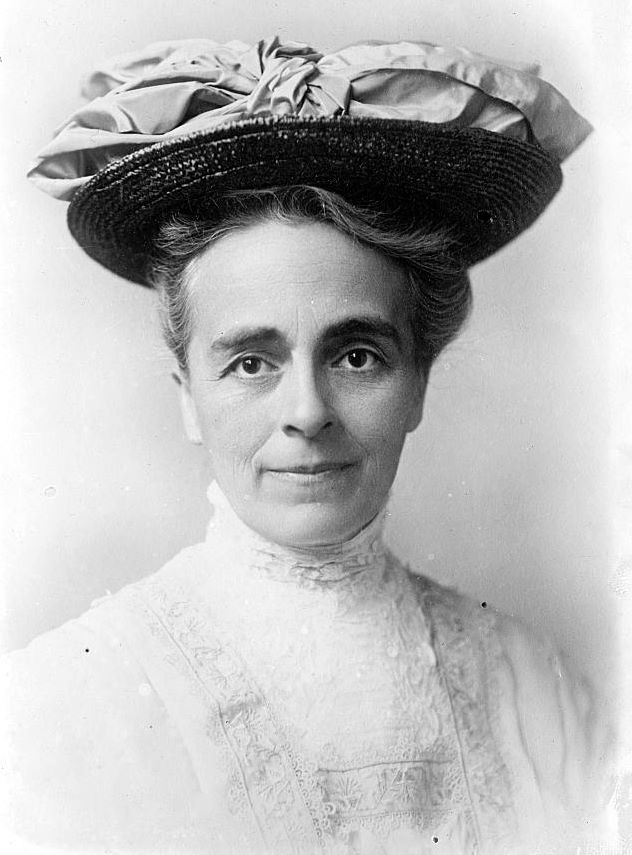
Catherine Waugh McCulloch

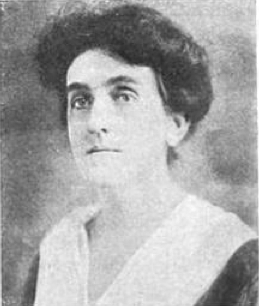
Valeria H. Parker

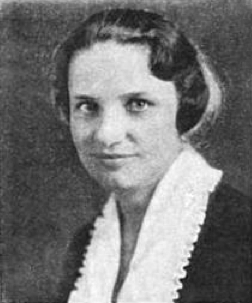
Mabel Walker Willebrandt

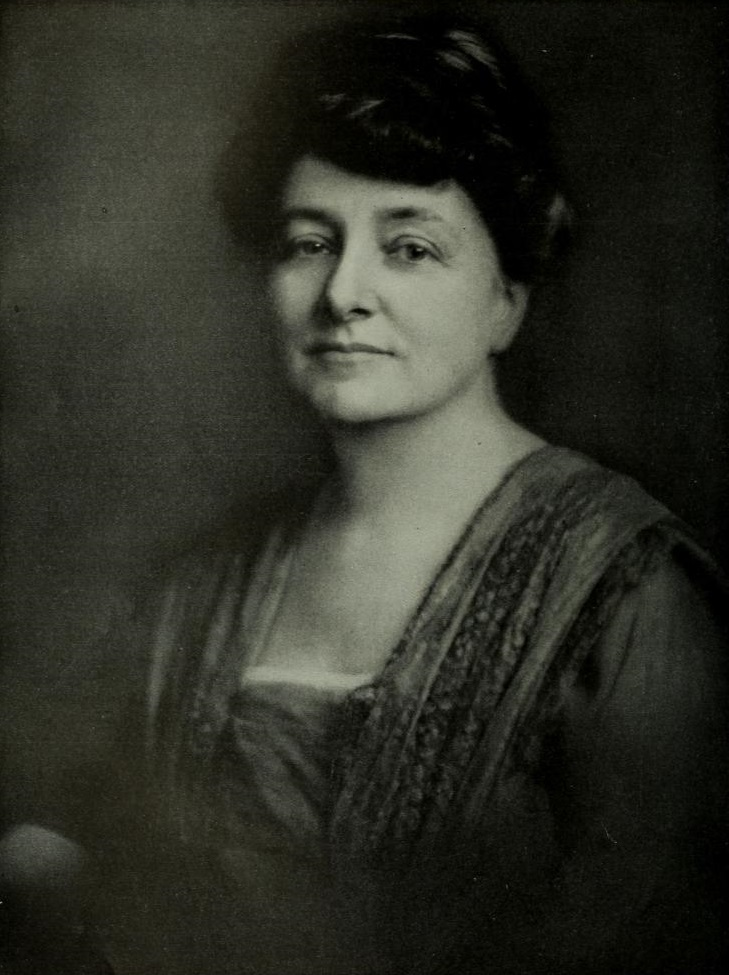
Maud Wood Park

Pan-American Conference of Women occurred in Baltimore, Maryland in 1922. It was held in connection with the third annual convention of the National League of Women Voters in Baltimore on April 20 to 29, 1922. Cooperating with the League in bringing the Pan American Women's conference to the United States were the US Secretary of State, Charles Evans Hughes, the US Secretary of Commerce, Herbert Hoover, and Dr. Leo Stanton Rowe, Director General of the Pan American Union (PAU). The conference was meant to strengthen and carry a step forward the initiative undertaken at the Second Pan American Scientific Congress, when a woman's auxiliary committee was formed to develop closer cooperation between the women of the American continent.

The countries who accepted the invitation to be present at the Conference and who sent delegates, were: Argentine, Bolivia, Brazil, Canada, Chile, Cuba, Costa Rica, Dominican Republic, Ecuador, Guatemala, Haiti, Honduras, Mexico, Nicaragua, Panama, Paraguay, Peru, Philippines, Puerto Rico, United States, Uruguay and Venezuela. The foreign delegates who attended the Congress were carefully chosen and were not political appointments but represented the most progressive and brilliant women in their countries. The foreign delegates represented 32 countries and two Provinces of Canada. There were in addition 23 delegates from foreign organizations, eight personal delegates from foreign countries, and a number of personal delegates from the US. The business or arrangement of the Pan-American Conference was achieved largely through the cooperation of the ambassadors from the Pan-American nations.

The delegates were met at various points throughout the US until their arrival in Baltimore. The sessions were held in Baltimore's Roof Garden of the Century Theatre and in the ballroom of the Belvedere Hotel. During the sessions, all the delegates sat upon the platform under the respective banners of their countries. The large Conference Hall was decorated with the flags of all the nations represented. Many of the foreign delegates spoke in Spanish and their speeches were interpreted; one or two spoke in French and a few in English.

== Background ==
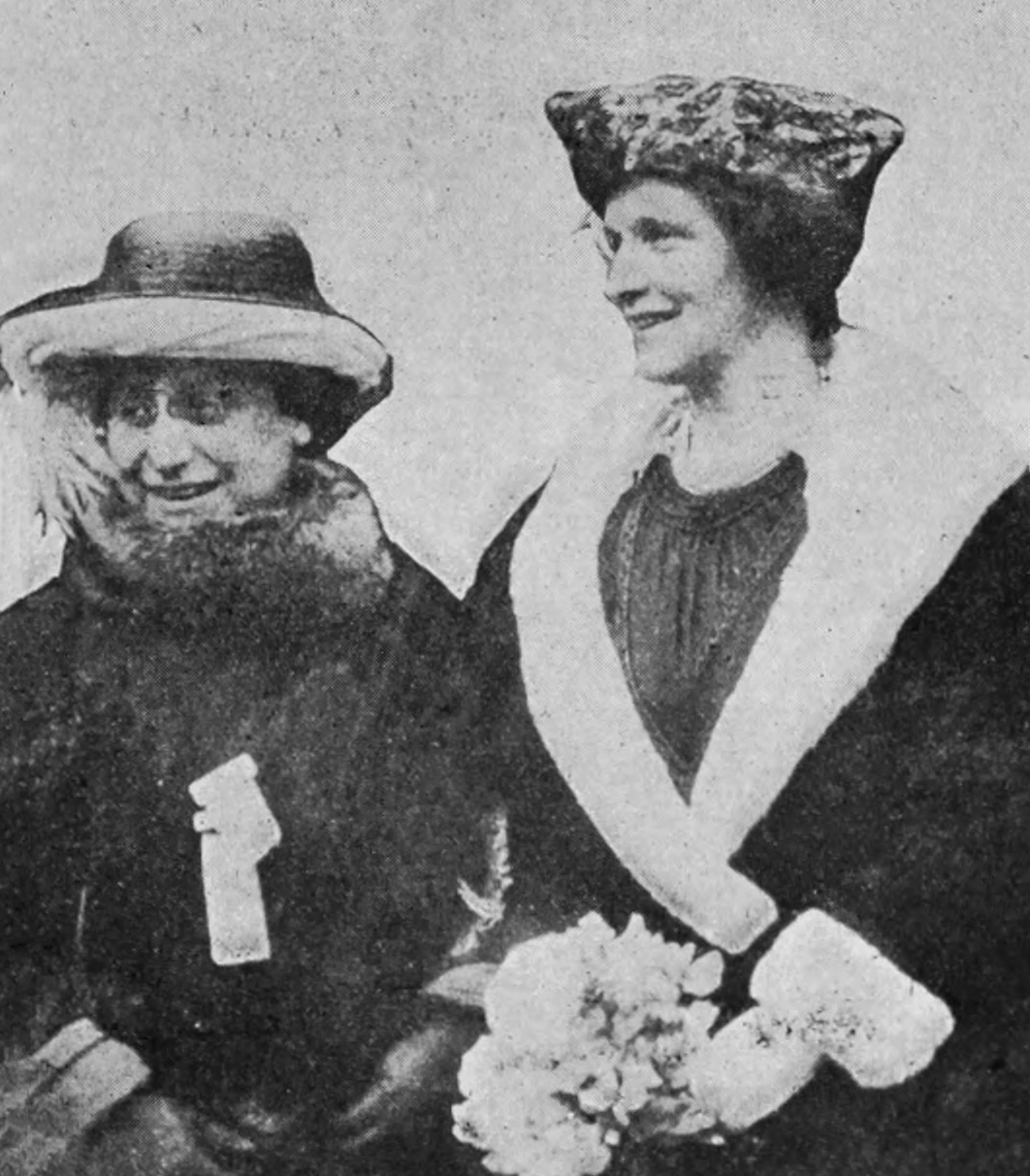
Mrs. Sydney M. Cone, conference secretary (left); Lady Nancy Astor, guest speaker (right)

The invitations to the governments of South and Central American countries to send delegates to this conference were forwarded through the US State Department and its diplomatic representatives in the Republics of Latin America. While not an official invitation from the Government of the US, the plan received the sanction and approval of administration officials, who viewed these types of conferences favorably, as they would promote a better understanding and more friendly relations between the citizens of the various countries. The main purpose of this conference, according to Maud Wood Park, national president of the League of Women Voters, was to bring the women of the US into more friendly relations with the women of South America, Central America, Mexico, and Canada.

Baltimore was selected as the next convention city of the PAU at the national convention which occurred in April 1921 at Cleveland, Ohio, this being on the joint invitation of the Maryland League of Women Voters, the State of Maryland through Governor Albert C. Ritchie, and the city of Baltimore through Mayor William Frederick Broening. Rowe concurred with the suggestion of the Maryland League of Women Voters that a Pan American conference of women would carry on and strengthen the friendly relations and good will between women of the countries represented by the PAU, the foundations for which were laid by the Woman's Auxiliary Committee of the Second Pan American Scientific Conference of December–January, 1915-16.

In making plans for the conference, the National League of Women Voters consulted with Hughes, Hoover, and Rowe who approved. The plans were first presented to Hughes and Hoover by a delegation consisting of Park, Madeleine Lemoyne Ellicott, Matilda Backus Maloy, and Lavinia Engle, representing the Maryland League of Women Voters; Gov. Ritchie; Henry G. Perring, representing the State of Maryland; and W. M. Brittain, representing the city of Baltimore. Upon its approval by the Cabinet officers, the plan was laid before the Baltimore Board of Trade by the league, receiving their endorsement.

The League of Women Voters believed that very definite results could be achieved through round-table conferences. Women everywhere were recognizing the necessity of raising the standards for women in industry, of securing legislation that would guard the civil rights of women, and of protecting in every possible way those who need protection. To this end it was fitting to discuss the best means to the desired end, and that the participants would have an opportunity to help one another through conference and consultation. Park said that women were instinctively ready to work together for the things that they wished to accomplish, because their interests were cooperative rather than competitive. "Women's distinctive interests are in common— home making, children, general welfare—whereas men's distinctive interests are sometimes of necessity conflicting and have to be settled by compromise. There is nothing about the ordinary occupations of women which is competitive. To illustrate, if the women of one nation are able to secure a child-welfare measure, and to develop and improve their work along these lines, their step in advance is a help and not a hindrance to the women of all other nations. The occupations and interests of women are the occupations and interests of peace, and lend themselves readily to cooperation."

== Program ==
The program was divided into six conference sessions, two being held each day:

- Child Welfare: Grace Abbott, Chief of Children's Bureau, United States Department of Labor, presiding; assisted La Rue Brown, Chairman of Committees on Child Welfare, National League of Women Voters
- Education: Julia Abbot, Bureau of Education, United States Department of Interior, presiding, assisted by Marian Kinney Brookings, Chairman of Committee on American Citizenship, National League
- Women in Industry: Mary Anderson, Chief of the Women's Bureau, United States Department of Labor, presiding, assisted by Mary McDowell, Chairman of Committee on Women in Industry, National League
- Prevention of Traffic in Women: Dr. Valeria H. Parker, Executive Secretary United States Interdepartmental Social Hygiene Board, presiding, assisted by Ann Webster, Chairman of Committee on Social Hygiene, National League
- Civil Status of Women: Mabel Walker Willebrandt, Assistant Attorney General, United States Department of Justice, presiding, assisted by Catherine Waugh McCulloch, Chairman of Uniform Laws concerning Women, National League
- Political Status of Women: Carrie Chapman Catt, President International Suffrage Alliance, presiding.

=== April 20th ===
The conference was opened on the morning of April 20 with an invocation delivered by Archbishop Michael Joseph Curley. Addresses of welcome followed by the Governor of Maryland and the Mayor of Baltimore. Park presided. Rowe was the first speaker on the regular program, and was followed by the various foreign delegates, each of whom reported briefly. The afternoon session was devoted to subjects pertaining to education and was presided over by Julia Abbott, of the United States Bureau of Education.

=== April 21st ===
The subject of the second day began with "Women in Industry," at which speeches were made by the delegates, Mary McDowell and Mrs. Raymond Robins of Chicago. At the request of Anderson, a summing up was made by the delegate from the US, who also emphasized the standards for the protection of working women in this country and urged the delegates to work for similar protective legislation. The afternoon was devoted to a session on, the "Prevention of Traffic in Women," presided over by Parker, at which speeches were made by several government officials and all the delegates. This session was again closed by the delegate from the US, who urged greater supervision of commercialized amusements for young people and the extension of constructive programs of wholesome recreation. That evening a special ball was held to honor the Latin American delegates. Among the invited guests were Robert Garcia, consul of Mexico, and Elena Landázuri, who served as a Spanish translator for the conference, as well as all of the delegates.

=== April 22nd ===
The third day was presided over by Willebrandt and was devoted to discussion of the Civil Status of Women. Speeches were made by an alderwoman from Toronto and Dr. Margaret Patterson, a police magistrate from the Province of Ontario. The afternoon session was on the Political Status of Women and was presided over by Catt, the honorary president of the National League of Women Voters, the first speech being made by the official delegate from the US, who urged women to run for office, join political parties, and take an active part in the political life of the nation.

== Discussions ==
At each of these conferences, brief reports on conditions in their respective countries were made by the delegates from foreign countries and the one delegate representing the US, Louise DeKoven Bowen, appointed by President Harding. A visiting delegate from Poland paid a high tribute to the participation of the United States in the work of the great World War. In her own words, "Were it not for the American Red Cross, there would probably not be alive in Poland today, a single child." The delegate from Argentina contrasted the objective of international organizations of men with that of women's organizations. "Not commerce, which men have called the blood of nations, nor any other material consideration," she said, "but international peace, permanent peace, is the ultimate objective of international conferences of women, such as the PanAmerican Conference." In the conference on Traffic in Women, a hopeful note was sounded by the delegate from Panama, who presented clearly and in forceful terms, the spiritual aspect of the problem. Again at this conference Graciela Mandujano, of Chile, a student at Columbia University, spoke of the White Cross League, organized by women of her nation for protective work among girls. A high water mark in progress was reported by Aurora Herrera de Nóbregas, of the State of Tamaulipas, Mexico, with its budget of $3,000,000 for education. Shower baths, medical attention and play grounds are a part of the equipment of the schools. Another Mexican delegate reported 1,000 free beds for maternity service in Mexico City. All delegates with the exception of Maria Clotilde Voga, of Nicaragua, stressed the importance of government aid in child welfare work. She said, in part, "We do not need state legislation to take care of children. The women of my country without such aid, are sponsoring day nurseries, schools of hygiene, and schools for special care of children." Matilde de Carbo said: "It is almost a disgrace in Ecuador to have less than six children in a family, and often there are a dozen." She outlined legislation projected by women of her country. Eighty-nine foreign newspapers in 15 countries requested current reports for publication.

== Resolution ==
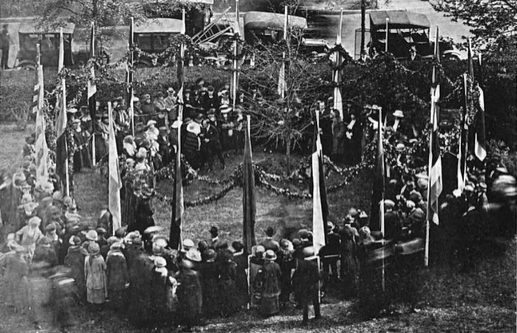
The tree planting ceremony on the grounds of the Pan American Union, April 28, 1922.

Conferences were held by groups of the foreign delegates with national leaders of the US for the purpose of organizing a permanent Pan-American Association of Women. This objective was finally achieved when at the Belvedere Hotel, on April 27, the organization meeting of the Pan-American Association of Women was held, at which Park was elected president. To quote from some of the women leaders; in the words of Catt: "It is undoubtedly one of the achievements of the age. A handful of women thoroughly awakened to the possibilities for educational and civic improvement, are sufficient to arouse the interest and attention of all with whom they come into contact. In fact, they cannot fail to do so. Bringing together a few women from the three Americas at a time when questions of paramount importance to women have been the topics of discussion by leaders of the woman movement, has been the beginning of a movement to establish unity between the women of the two continents. I regard the Pan-American Conference and the establishment of a permanent organization as an entering wedge. It may seem to have started with very few women, but I am confident that these women will see far-reaching effects." "The permanent organization," said Bertha Lutz, of Brazil, "is the natural and necessary outcome of the Pan-American Conference. I believe that it will cement the friendship which exists between the two continents and will keep the peace. It will make possible co-operation between women of the two Americas and will enable them to learn from each other the best things which are being done for women and for children. It is decidedly a progressive step for all women." The comment of Ester Neira De Calvo, of Panama, was as follows: "I think that the future holds for us an opportunity to work with the League of Women Voters for the realization of ideals, common to the women of both North and South America." Dr. Bedrich Stepanek, Minister from Czechoslovakia, made a plea for an international association of women. Following the completion of the meetings of the Pan-America Conference, practically all of the foreign delegates remained in Baltimore as the guests of the Convention of the National League of Women Voters.

The direct result of the meeting was the formation of a permanent Pan-American Association, with these officers: honorary president, Catt; president, Park; honorary vice-president, Dr. Paulina Luisi of Uruguay; vice-presidents, Elena Torres of Mexico, Ester Niera De Calvo of Panama, and Lutz of Brazil; secretary, Maria Suarez De Coronado of Colombia; treasurer, Olga Capurro De Varela of Uruguay. There was an advisory committee with a representative from each of the 22 countries sending delegates to the conference. The aims of the Association were: "To promote general education among all women and to secure for them higher standards of education; to secure the rights of married women to control their own property and their own wages; to secure equal guardianship; to encourage organization, discussion and public speaking among women, and freedom of opportunity for all women to cultivate and use all their talents; to educate public opinion'in favor of granting the vote to women and secure their political rights; and to promote friendliness and understanding among the Pan-American countries to the end that there may be perpetual peace in the western hemisphere."

== Latin America attendees ==
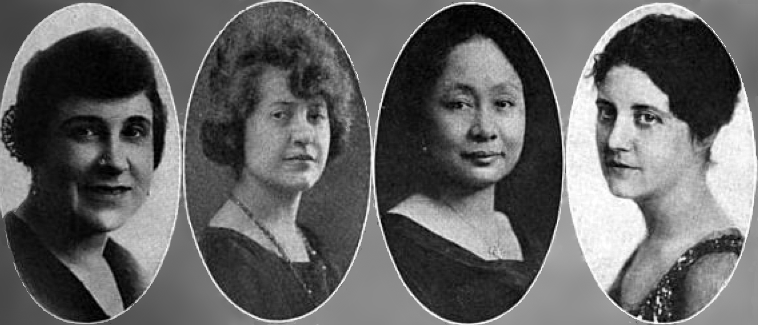
From left: Carmen de Pinillos (Peru), Pastoriza Flores (Ecuador), Mrs. C. de Veyra (Philippines), Mrs. Jacobo Valera (Uruguay)

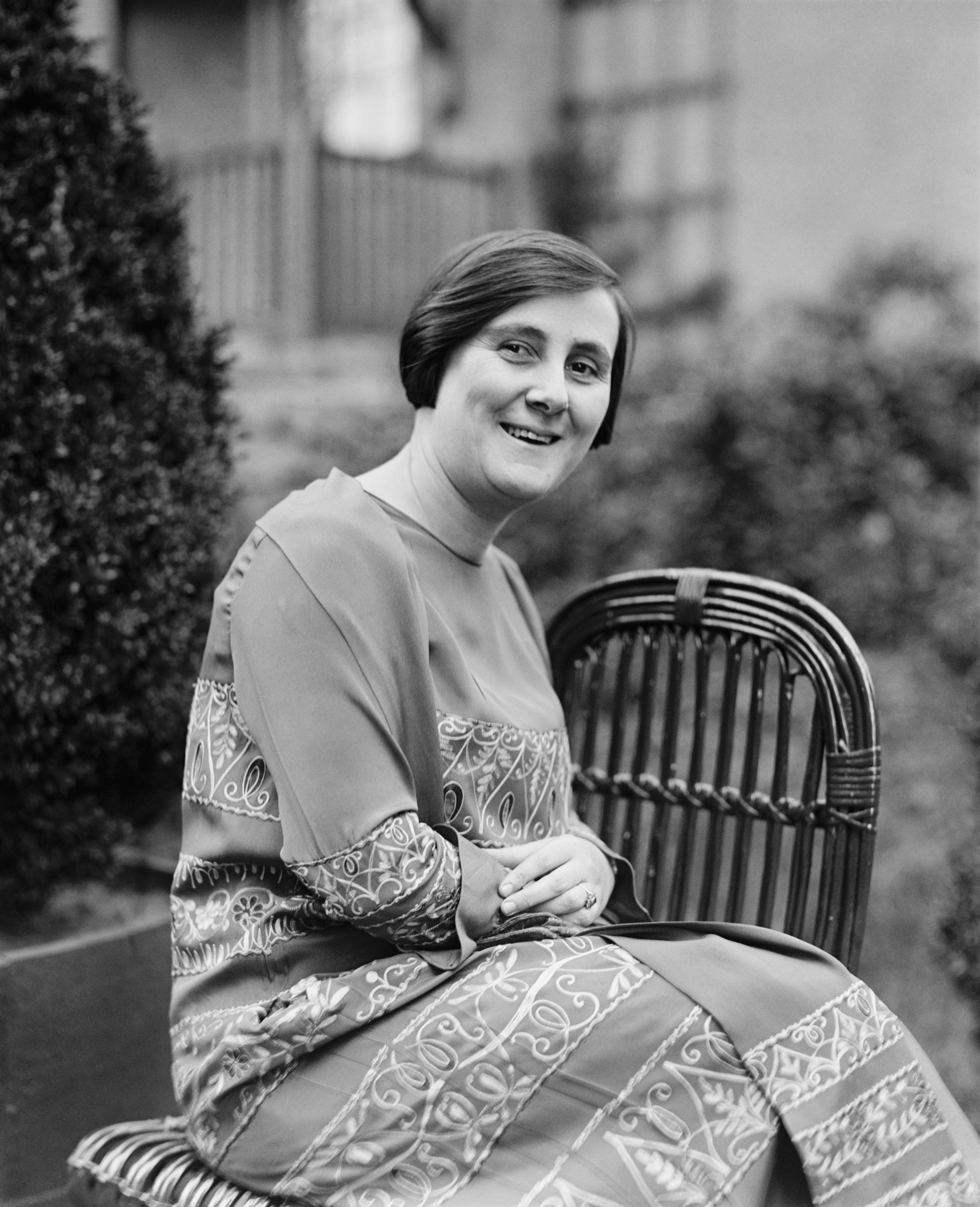
Berta Lutz

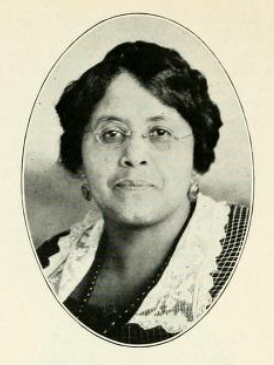
Sadie Lewis Adams

The Latin American members of the conference included:

- Argentina, Sra. de Le Breton; as alternate: Mrs. Eleanor Lowry de Dickinson.
- Bolivia, Sra. Arcadia Calderon de Zalles
- Brazil, Dona Bertha Lutz, Dona Beatriz do Queiroz, Miss Annie d'Armand Marchant
- Chile, Sra. do Mathicu, Srta. Graciela Mandujano, Srta. Margarita Mieres, Sra. Sofia de Ferrari Rojas, Srta. Luisa Zanelle Lopez, Srta. Margarita Lopez de Collio, Srta. Corina Urbina Villanueva,
- Colombia, Sra. Maria Suaxcz de Coronado, Srta. Hortensia Coronado, Srta. Maria Ordonez; Costa Rica, Sra. Sara Casal de Quirós
- Cuba, Sra. Emma Lopez Sena de Garrido, Sra. Elena de la Pena, Srta. L. Z. del Portillo
- Dominican Republic, Sra. Ofelia P. de Joubert
- Ecuador, Sra. Matilde de Carbo, Srta. Beatriz Carbo, Srta. Hortensia Balarezo, Srta. Pastoriza Flores, Srta. Maria Flores
- Guatemala, Sra. de Sanchez Latour
- Haiti, Mme. Charles Dube; Honduras, Srta. Mercedes Lainez
- Mexico, Srta. Elena Torres, Sra. Aurora Herrera, Sra. Luisa Garza, Srta. Eulalia Guzmán, Srta. Maria Renterfa de Meza, Sra. Julia Nava de Ruisánchez, Sra. M. C. Conde de Avila, Srta. Luz Vera
- Nicaragua, Srta. Maria Clotilde Vega, Srta. Juanita Molina
- Panama, Sra. Ester Niera de Calvo
- Paraguay, Srta. Maria Felicidad Gonzales, Srta. Ruby Gutierrez
- Peru, Srta. Margarita Conroy, Srta. Zerla Antay, Sra. Carmen de Pinillos, Srta. Laura Memeses del Caprio
- Puerto Rico, Milagros Benet de Mewton and Ana Teresa Paradas
- Uruguay, Sra. Olga Capurro de Varela, Sra. Celia Paladino de Vitale, Sr. Carlos E. Monteverde
- Venezuela, Sra. Mercedes de Guevara

In addition, there were 27 delegates from Canada and 50 from the United States, besides eight from Puerto Rico and one from the Philippines. Among the US delegates was Sadie L. Adams, an African-American suffragist and the president of the Chicago and Northern District Association of Colored Women's Clubs.
