= Elena Arizmendi Mejía =

Mexican feminist writer and philanthropist

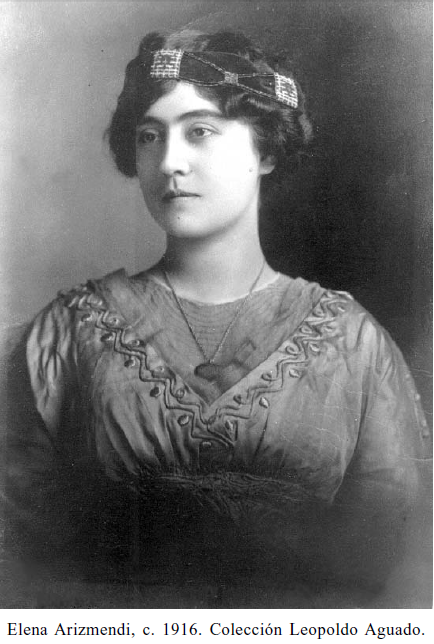
- Born: 18 January 1884; Mexico City, Mexico
- Died: 4 November 1949 (aged 65); Mexico City, Mexico
- Occupations: Philanthropist, journalist, women's and children's activist
- Years active: 1920–1938
- Known for: Established the Neutral White Cross

Elena Arizmendi Mejía (18 January 1884 – 4 November 1949) was a Mexican feminist who established the Neutral White Cross to care for casualties of the Mexican Revolution that the Red Cross would not aid. Participating in the first wave of Mexican feminism, she established two international women's rights organizations: the "Mujeres de la Raza" (Women of the [Hispanic] Race) and the International League of Iberian and Latin American Women.

Arizmendi was born in 1884 to a prominent and well-connected family in Mexico City. After completing her studies, she had a brief marriage which ended in divorce. As options for women were limited, she decided to study nursing at the School of Nursing of the Santa Rosa Hospital in San Antonio, Texas. Shortly before her graduation in 1911, Arizmendi returned to Mexico to found a medical relief organization. Since the Mexican Red Cross refused to provide care for revolutionaries, Arizmendi used her contacts to raise funds and organize the Neutral White Cross. The organization was apolitical and established field hospitals to care for any wounded combatants involved in the Mexican Revolution. During the war, she sought legal advice from José Vasconcelos and their relationship turned into a long-term love affair.

In 1915, the political climate in Mexico caused Arizmendi and Vasconcelos to go into exile. The couple lived briefly in the United States and Peru. When he made plans to return to see his wife in Mexico, Arizmendi broke off their affair and moved to New York City in 1916. She began working as a music teacher and journalist and married a German national, who later became a US citizen. Arizmendi lost her Mexican nationality because of nineteenth-century legislation which required married women to have the same nationality as their husband. Though the marriage was brief, Arizmendi remained in the United States working in feminist causes from 1921 to the mid-1930s. In addition to founding two feminist organizations, she founded the magazine, Feminismo Internacional (International Feminism), to publish feminist information by and about Spanish and Latin American women and combat the stereotypical views held about them from Anglo-American feminists. In 1927, she wrote a fictionalized autobiography, Vida incompleta (Incomplete Life), to explain her views on feminism and the double standards women faced in living their lives.

Returning to Mexico in 1938, she helped the White Cross change its direction into an organization to benefit children. At the time of her death in 1949, she was remembered primarily for her philanthropy. The White Cross, which still operates as a children's health organization, named its dispensary in the Xochimilco borough of Mexico City after her and persuaded the government to name a street in Colonia del Valle in her honor in 1985. Scholarly interest in her life emerged in the 21st century, recovering her legacy as a feminist and writer.

== Early life and education ==
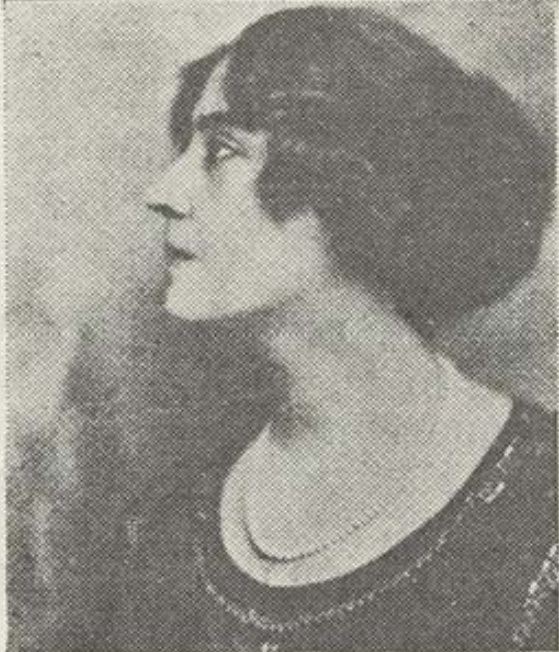
Elena Arizmendi Mejia (1884-1949)

Elena Arizmendi Mejía was born on 18 January 1884 in Mexico City to Jesús Arizmendi and Isabel Mejía. Her well-to-do family was connected to those involved in the modernization of Mexico. She was the granddaughter of Ignacio Mejía, who served as Mexican Secretary of War and was a Division General under the regime of President Benito Juárez. Her great-grandfather was Lieutenant Colonel Manuel Cristóbal Mejía, who fought in the Mexican War of Independence in the army of Agustín de Iturbide. Arizmendi spent some of her early years with her grandfather in Oaxaca and then returned to Mexico City at about the age of eight. She was schooled in Mexico City, likely at Colegio La Paz, where girls could attend for six years. When her mother died in 1898, Arizmendi became responsible for caring for her siblings and looking after the household. When her father remarried in 1900, Arizmendi hastily married Francisco Carreto that same year in Chilpancingo, Guerrero. The union quickly crumbled because of domestic violence and the death of their only child to meningitis in 1903. (Note: Nursing historian Juan Rodolfo Collado Soto, states that the pregnancy was terminated. "Su matrimonio con Carreto representó una salida digna del hogar pero tuvo un desenlace triste en virtud que Elena fue víctima de violencia familiar y un embarazo mal logrado que concluyó en aborto, obligándola a separarse de su marido". Scholar Stephanie Mitchell, reported that the child was stillborn rendering Arizmendi infertile. Arizmendi and Carreto married on 22 November 1900; their son Francisco Tiburcio Carreto Arizmendi was born on 11 August 1902; and he died on 17 April 1903. The 1903 death certificate for Francisco Carreto Arizmendi shows he was eight months old and died of meningitis ("fallecio meningitis cerebro-espinal, el niño Francisco Carreto de 8 meses de edad hijo").) She was able to secure a divorce because she had the financial means to leave their home and did not demand his continued financial maintenance.

== Career ==
=== Nursing ===
After her separation, Arizmendi returned to Mexico City to care for her siblings and evaluate whether she wanted to become a nurse or a teacher, the limited options available to women of her era. To supplement her education she read widely, including Greek classics, and was influenced by Swedish feminist Ellen Key's views on women's sexuality. Her family connections protected her from the repercussions and typical social stigma of divorce. Choosing nursing, she decided to study at the School of Nursing of the Santa Rosa Hospital (now the School of Nursing at the University of the Incarnate Word) in San Antonio, Texas. Her family had close ties with Francisco I. Madero, who would later become President of Mexico, and the school in which Arizmendi was enrolled was near Madero's Texas retreat. In 1910, while she was studying, the Mexican Revolution began. On 17 April 1911, a few weeks prior to her graduation, Arizmendi returned to Mexico City to help wounded combatants, as the Mexican Red Cross refused to provide aid to insurgents. She viewed her involvement as a patriotic duty, to serve her country in war as her grandfather had done. Arizmendi arranged a personal meeting with the head of the Red Cross, who reiterated the refusal to support revolutionaries. Determined to help her countrymen, Arizmendi founded an aid organization and, with her brother Carlos, rallied medical students and nurses to organize Cruz Blanca Neutral (Neutral White Cross).

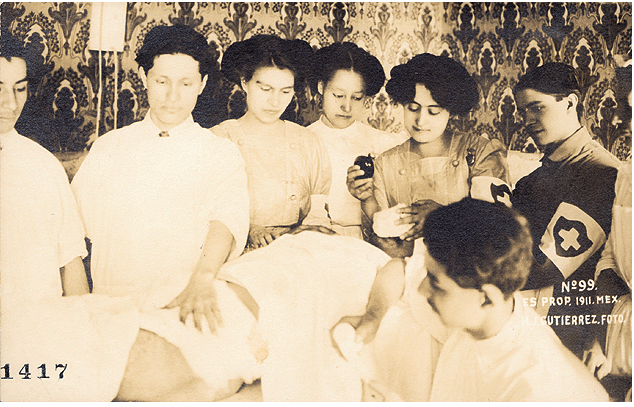
Elena Arizmendi (holding the anesthesia bottle and cotton) and volunteers of the Neutral White Cross, 1911

Forming an association under the guidelines of the Geneva Conventions, Arizmendi became the fundraiser, enlisting the help of celebrities like María Conesa, Virginia Fábregas, and Leopoldo Beristáin. After numerous appeals, they collected sufficient funds for a field hospital and on 11 May 1911, set off for Ciudad Juárez. Arizmendi and Carlos formed the first brigade with doctors Ignacio Barrios and Antonio Márquez, and nurses María Avon, Juana Flores Gallardo, Atilana García, Elena de Lange, and Tomasa Villareal. The second brigade, led by Dr. Francisco, left the following day, and on the 14th a third brigade followed, headed by Dr. Lorenzo and ten nurses, including Innocenta Díaz, Concepción Ibáñez, Jovita Muñiz, Concepción Sánchez, María Sánchez, Basilia Vélez, María Vélez, and Antonia Zorilla.

Arriving in Juárez, they found devastation, and again Arizmendi had to rally for funds. By the end of 1911, the Neutral White Cross had established 25 brigades across Mexico. Arzimendi was elected as the first woman partner of the Sociedad Mexicana de Geografía y Estadística, but she rejected the honor. She did accept a gold medal presented to her for dedication to helping the wounded by the Gran Liga Obrera (Grand Worker League). Arizmendi was both revered for her philanthropy and disliked for her leadership at a time when women were expected to be docile and submissive. Tensions arose with the medical students over her role as the public voice of the organization in light of her limited medical training and because of her connections with elite donors. There were attacks on her leadership of the White Cross, such as when she had a photograph taken as a joke with the crossed cartridge belts of male revolutionary soldiers and soldaderas and was accused of violating the neutrality of the health organization. She was also accused of mismanagement of the organizational funds. Arizmendi asked Madero for assistance with her role in the White Cross, and was referred to seek legal council from José Vasconcelos. He successfully defended her of the accusation of mishandling the organizational funds.

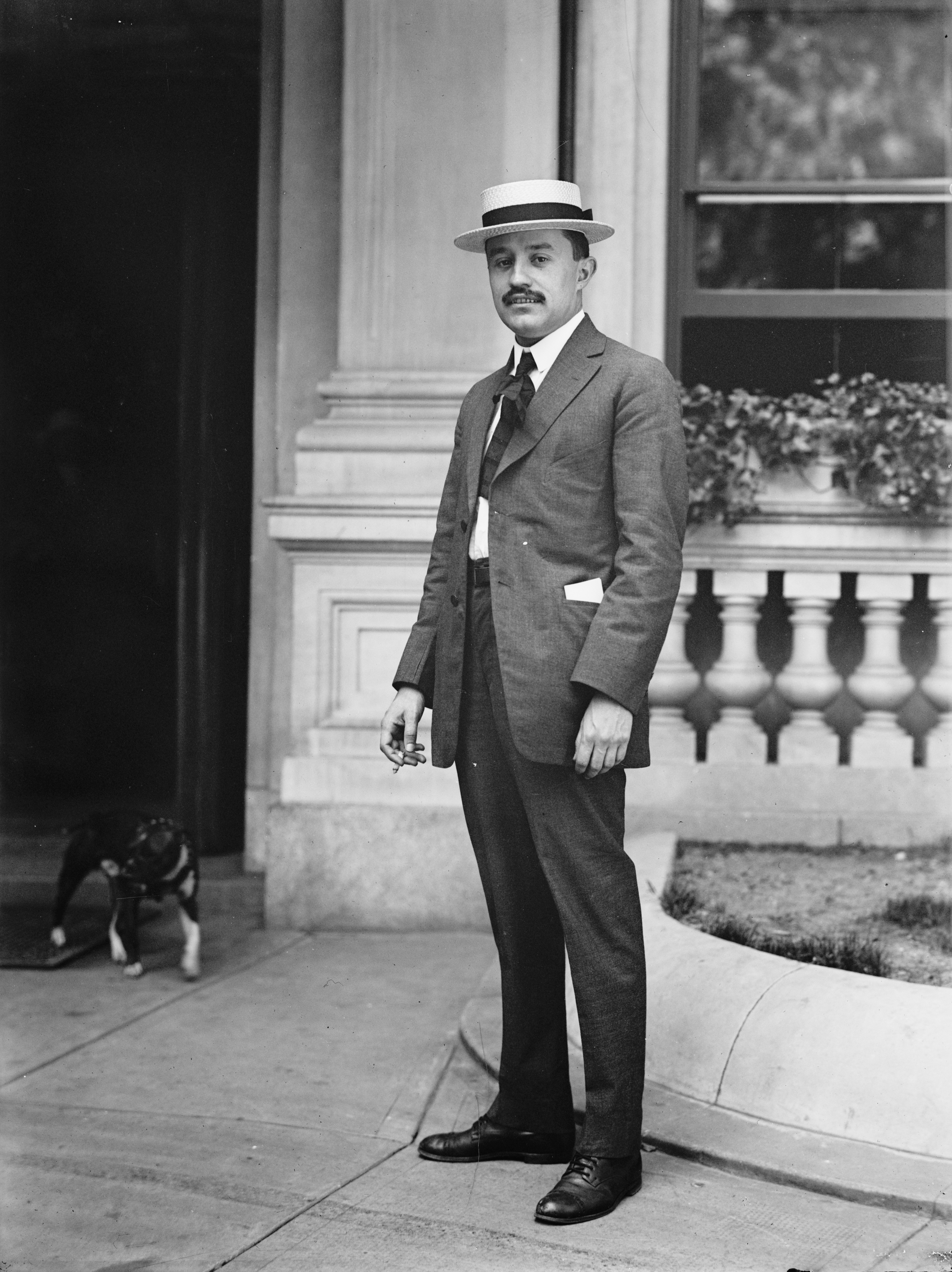
Jose Vasconcelos, 1914

The working relationship of Arizmendi and Vasconcelos, who was married with two children, turned into a long-term affair. Historian Enrique Krauze described Arizmendi as "the first of many lovers in his life but certainly his most intense and madly beloved liaison". Upon the assassination of Madero in 1913, Arizmendi and Vasconcelos joined the faction known as convencionistas, who were against President Victoriano Huerta. When Álvaro Obregón defeated the convencionistas in 1915, she and Vaconcelos went into exile. Though at one time Arizmendi had taken refuge in a convent in Victoria, Texas, to hide from the public scandal of her relationship with Vasconcelos, when she left Mexico in mid-1915 it was with the intent of maintaining her relationship with him. They first lived in the United States and she accompanied him to Lima, Peru. Arizmendi broke off the relationship in 1916, tiring of being the other woman, as Vasconcelos prepared to return to Mexico. He wrote about her in his autobiography, La Tormenta, giving her the pseudonym "Adriana". Vasconcelos's description of the relationship "is the most famous depiction of 'mad love' in Mexican literature", according to Krauze. Vasconcelos described Arizmendi as a perfect lover until she left him, when she became a "femme fatale", a "harpy", and a "devourer of men".

=== Activism ===
Arizmendi made her way to New York City, where Vasconcelos attempted an unsuccessful reconciliation with her. He remained in exile, traveling between California and Texas until he was able to return to Mexico in 1920. Helped by Pedro Henríquez Ureña, she began working as a journalist, writing for newspapers and magazines, and giving music lessons. On 24 December 1918, she married Robert Duersch, a German national, acquiring his nationality. Under the 1886 Mexican Law of Alienship and Naturalization, women automatically took the nationality of their spouse upon marriage. (Note: Mexican law would not change to allow women individual nationality until 1934. However, the nationality statute of that year required that women who had formerly lost their Mexican status had to apply to be naturalized if they wished to repatriate.) German nationality laws required the entire family to follow the nationality of the husband and father. If a man naturalized all members of his family were considered to have naturalized. (Note: In 1949, women were granted equality under German law and could no longer have their nationality status change without their consent.) Duersch naturalized as a United States citizen in 1924 and Arizmendi became a US national under Mexican law, despite the fact that she identified as Mexican. (Note: As dual nationality was prohibited under the 1913 German Nationality Law, acquisition of another nationality terminated German status, thus a woman, required under German law to have the same status as her husband, would have lost her German nationality.) In a series of letters exchanged with Mexican Consul General in New York, Arturo M. Elías, Arizmendi replied to his chastisement of her political involvement in the United States, that under the Mexican statute she was a US national because her husband was and thus she had a right to be politically active. Laurie Fransman, a leading expert on British nationality law, pointed out that the legal practice of changing a woman's nationality upon marriage based upon her husband's nationality assumes that a nation has the ability to confer the nationality of another nation upon a subject. Under the terms of the 1922 US Cable Act, foreign women could not automatically acquire a husband's status. She would have been allowed a preferential process, which waived residency requirements, but required her to complete an individual application and pass the naturalization examination in order to become a United States citizen.

Arizmendi was one of the founders of the International League of Iberian and Latin American Women (Liga Internacional de Mujeres Ibéricas e Hispanoamericanas) and served as its first vice president from 1921. The following year, she attended the Pan-American Conference of Women, held in Baltimore, Maryland, as a private attendee rather than part of the official Mexican delegation, which included among others, María Luisa Garza, Eulalia Guzmán, Julia Nava, Elena Torres, and Luz Vera. Though the official delegates did not resent the racism and superiority displayed by attendees such as Lady Nancy Astor, who declared she would never visit Latin America because of the prevalence of violence there, Arizmendi was angered by such assertions. When Carrie Chapman Catt abandoned a proposed trip to Latin America because of stereotypical ideas, Arizmendi realized that European and American feminists did not grasp the cultural realities of Hispanic women. She and other Latin American feminists saw matrimony and motherhood as an integral part of their identity. They believed that well-educated wives and mothers, without leaving the domestic sphere, could engage in professional and political activities. In her view, Spanish custom, culture, history, language and Catholicism, were the characteristics that united Hispanic feminists. Though she was not Catholic, Arizmendi saw the anti-clerical movement of the post-revolutionary governments as an attack on a central part of her Mexican identity.

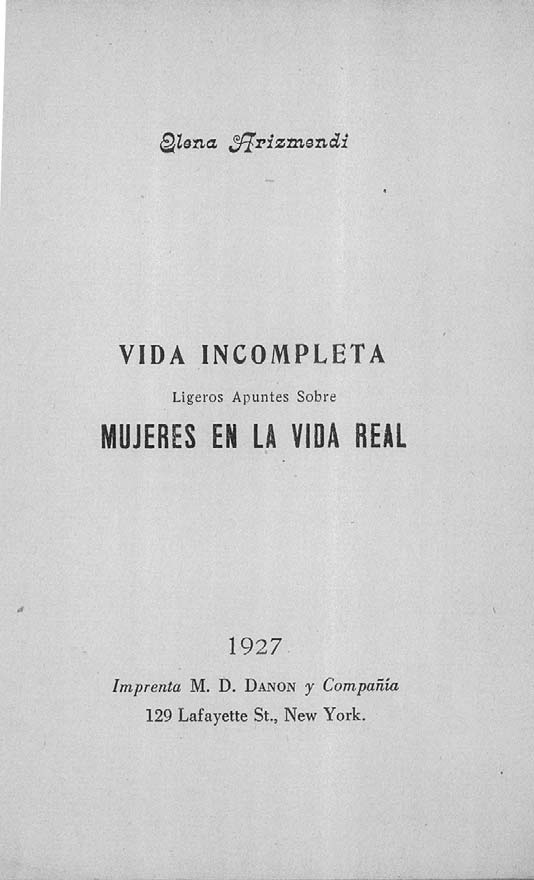
Vida Incompleta, Arizmendi, 1927

To confront these perspectives and to give a voice to Latin American women, Arizmendi planned to found a feminist center to disseminate information by and about Spanish and Latin American women. She founded a feminist magazine, Feminismo Internacional (International Feminism), and began publishing articles reflecting Hispanic versions of feminism. Arizmendi promoted legal reforms, specifically those impacting women's personal and marital rights. The magazine operated from November 1922 to October 1923 under Arizmendi's leadership and was then merged with La Revista de la Raza (The Magazine of the Race), published in Madrid. She published articles about feminist movements in various Latin American countries and included articles written by both women and men to show that the misogynistic and sexist stereotypes of Latin men were unfounded. Though they sought to unite feminists from Spain and Latin America, Arizmendi's vision did not include indigenous heritage as part of their shared culture. As an Arielist, she valued Spanish culture and Christianity over the expansion of values from the United States in Latin America and devalued the cultural contributions of indigenous people and Africans. Though she defended United States' culture from unwarranted criticism, believing that it did have some valuable elements. Her views were representative of the upper and middle-class women who saw the wide-spread participation of women in industry as harmful to the family, while simultaneously recognizing that modernization of public and family relationships was needed.

In 1923, Arizmendi co-founded with G. Sofía Villa de Buentello a co-operative union, Mujeres de la Raza (Women of the [Hispanic] Race), with aims of uniting Latin American women in the struggle for rights. The operations of both the Mujeres de la Raza and its magazine under the same name were primarily funded by Arizmendi. Mujeres de la Raza rejected feminism as a solely political action, instead maintaining it was focused on moral leadership and an intellectual battle against incompetence. For example, women attaining the franchise was a moral action because it was illogical that illiterate men could vote while educated women could not. At the time, Latin America was seen as the next "staging ground", as suffrage had been gained in Europe and the United States and Pan-Americanism was gaining ground. Arizmendi and Villa planned a conference for the Mujeres de la Raza funded by the International League of Iberian and Latin American Women, for which Arizmendi had become the secretary general. Arizmendi used her press contacts and secured coverage in The New York Times to promote the event. On 2 March 1924, an extensive article about the feminist movement in Mexico titled "New Women of Mexico Striving for Equality" carried an interview with Villa, who gave an overview of their goals. The meeting occurred in July 1925 in Mexico City with Villa as president of the conference. There were more than a hundred delegates from various Latin American nations. Arizmendi did not attend due to differences of opinion with Villa, whose views were conservative. Villa attempted to close the conference when her view of marriage, that it was a lifetime commitment and divorce would only harm women by giving men their freedom, was rejected. The feminists attending the conference ignored Villa and continued their work to consolidate resolutions to improve women's lives.

By 1927, Arizmendi had separated from Duersch, because of incompatibility, and when Vasconcelos returned to New York that year, she interviewed him for the Revista de la Raza. The interview was focused on the political climate of Mexico and his candidacy for the National Anti-Reelectionist Party in the upcoming presidential election. That year, Arizmendi published an autobiography, Vida incompleta; ligeros apuntes sobre mujeres en la vida real (Incomplete Life: Quick Notes about Women in Real Life), with the purpose of airing her side of the affair and silencing rumors about her public life. Since Vasconcelos had published two works, Ulises Criollo and La Tormenta, vilifying Arizmendi as a fictionalized character, Arizmendi's fictionalized autobiography is a reflection on the double standards women encountered and her attempt to explain male-female relationships in a feminist context. She wrote candidly about the conflicts in her relationships with both Vasconcelos and Duersch, but also covered cultural and gender differences between Anglo- and Latin-American society. In later editions of his works, Vacsoncelos expunged some of his most damaging descriptions of their affair from his works. In addition to her writing, Arizmendi continued to administrate the International League of Iberian and Latin American Women through the mid-1930s.

=== Later life ===
For the 25th-anniversary commemoration of the organization of the White Cross in 1936, and partly because President Lázaro Cárdenas supported suffrage, Arizmendi returned briefly to Mexico. She returned to New York, but moved permanently back to Mexico City in 1938. At the time she returned to Mexico, the period of social reforms had ended and she distanced herself from the government and feminist organizations. Though the furor over her relationship with Vasconcelos had cooled, it remained a factor in her choice to lead a private life. Throughout her life, she had continued to administer the White Cross, but it had shifted focus to offering services for children, operating as a social assistance center, medical center, children's shelter, and eventually a polyclinic. Government indifference led to her seeking private funding in 1942, and Rodulfo Brito Foucher became the benefactor of the organization. A two-decades-long battle ensued over the funds when the Secretariat of the Treasury blocked the organization from receiving the funds.

== Death and legacy ==
Arizmendi died in Mexico City on 4 November 1949 and was buried at the Panteón Jardín in the Villa Obregón borough of the city. Her funeral was attended by family members and beneficiaries and officials of the White Cross, but no notice of her death was published. At her death, Arizmendi was known mostly for her charitable works, and as the inspiration for the character Adriana, in Vasconcelos works. According to professor Gabriela Cano Ortega, historians and critics have noted that Arizmendi was known for her physical beauty and the warmth of her personality, despite her privilege as an elite member of society. She was photographed by Salvador Toscano and was the subject of an engraving by José Guadalupe Posada. The White Cross named its dispensary in the Xochimilco borough in her honor and, in 1985, persuaded the government to rename a street with her name in the Colonia del Valle. The White Cross organization which she founded still exists in the Coyoacán neighborhood of Mexico City. It is now dedicated to the care of children with severe malnutrition needs.

Arizmendi was the subject of a 2010 biography, Se llamaba Elena Arizmendi, (Her Name Was Elena Arizmendi), written by Cano, a gender studies specialist who rigorously and critically researches the limited history of Mexican women, who were often obscured behind their male partners. In 2012, Cano wrote a foreword for and republished Arizmendi's autobiography, as the original book had a limited circulation. Carolina Villarroel, one of the founders of the University of Houston's US Latino Digital Humanities Center, called Arizmendi's Vida incompleta "the first Hispanic feminist novel". In 2018, Arizmendi was the focus of an academic treatment, Mi esposo y mi nación: la nacionalidad de las mujeres casadas en México, 1886–1934 (My Husband and My Nation: The Nationality of Married Women in Mexico, 1886–1934) analyzing the impact of government policy between 1886 and 1934 of denaturalizing women, who identified as Mexican and were involved in work they deemed to be for the benefit of the nation.

== Autobiography ==
- Arizmendi, Elena (1927). Vida incompleta; ligeros apuntes sobre mujeres en la vida real [Incomplete Life: Quick Notes about Women in Real Life] (in Spanish) (1ª ed.). New York, New York: M.D. Danon y Compañía. OCLC 651350504.
- Arizmendi, Elena (2012). Cano, Gabriela (ed.). Vida incompleta; ligeros apuntes sobre mujeres en la vida real [Incomplete Life: Quick Notes about Women in Real Life] (in Spanish) (2nd ed.). Cuauhtémoc, Mexico City: Colección Singulares. ISBN 978-607-455-892-0.
