= Elena Landázuri =

Mexican musician and activist (1888–1970)

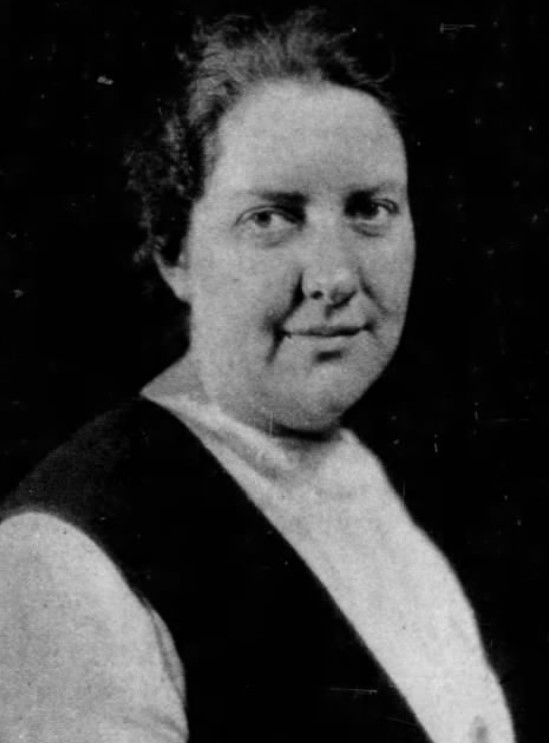
- Landázuri, 1924
- Born: María Elena Landázuri Gil; 30 December 1888; Tacubaya, Mexico City, Mexico
- Died: 10 December 1970 (aged 81); Coyoacán, Mexico City, Mexico
- Occupations: Social worker, musician, and activist
- Years active: 1915-1940s
- Father: Pedro Landázuri

María Elena Landázuri Gil (30 December 1888 – 10 December 1970) was a Mexican educator, musician, pacifist, and woman's rights activist. She was born into an upper-class family and grew up in Mexico City. After attending the National Conservatory of Music, she earned a degree in music from the Universidad Nacional Autónoma de México (UNAM, National Autonomous University of Mexico) and began teaching there. In 1915, she wrote a libretto for the opera Dos amores (Two Loves), which was composed by Rafael J. Tello. It was the first known libretto by a Mexican woman and premiered within a year. When an educational exchange program was launched between Mexico and the United States in 1918, she enrolled in sociology courses at the University of Chicago. While in Chicago, she worked in various settlement houses becoming friends with feminists Grace Abbott, Jane Addams, and Mary McDowell. Joining the Consejo Feminista Mexicano (Feminist Council of Mexico), she represented the organization at the 1921 Vienna congress and 1924 Washington congress of the Women's International League for Peace and Freedom. She served as a translator for the 1922 Pan-American Conference of Women held in Baltimore, Maryland and organized with Elena Torres the 1923 Pan-American Conference of Women at Mexico City.

Graduating with a degree in philosophy from the University of Chicago in 1923, Landázuri returned to Mexico City and founded with the assistance of Caroline Duval Smith, the American advisor for the Young Women's Christian Association (YWCA), the first Mexican YWCA organization. She served as General Secretary until 1924, when she resigned over policy issues and lack of the organization's focus on women's rights. From 1924 to 1932, she served on the executive board of the international WILPF organization. Going to work for the Mexican Secretary of Public Education, she participated in the literacy campaign of José Vasconcelos. She helped establish an Indigenous school in Hidalgo, represented the government at the first World Conference of Educators, and worked with Elena Torres to make the authorities aware of problems facing rural teachers. In addition, she worked as a research assistant to anthropologists like Manuel Gamio, Greta Redfield, and Robert Redfield, who were studying the cultural development of Mexico in the post-revolutionary period of modernization.

Landázuri conducted her own research into social developments in the 1930s and moved from education into social work. She became the head of the Children's Hygiene Service of the Ministry of Health and developed a home nursing corps to monitor the health of mothers and children. In the 1940s, she headed the medical records library at the Hospital Infantil de México (Infants Hospital of Mexico). She died in Mexico City in 1970, and was forgotten, until her history was rediscovered in the twenty-first century.

== Early life and education ==
María Elena Landázuri Gil was born on 30 December 1888 in the Tacubaya neighborhood of Mexico City to Dolores Gil and Pedro Landázuri. Her family belonged to the upper class and her father was a politician. Her father's first wife was the Spanish poet, Isabel Prieto, with whom he had three children: Jorge, Blanca, and Raúl. After serving as private secretary to President Sebastián Lerdo de Tejada, and a member of the Chamber of Deputies, Pedro was assigned to the post of Mexican consul in Hamburg, Germany, where Isabel died. He returned to Mexico and in 1882, he was appointed as second alternate Senator for the State of Guerrero and also as provisional governor of Jalisco. Landázuri's parents married in Guadalajara in 1883. Her mother was the daughter of Ana Rívas and Ignacío Gíl Romero. Landázuri's older brother Pedro died before his first birthday. She had an older sister, also named María, who was born in 1885. Her father was a free thinker and her mother was Catholic.

From a young age, Landázuri was tutored at home and studied music. Later she attended the National Conservatory of Music and studied art and philosophy at the Universidad Nacional Autónoma de México (UNAM, National Autonomous University of Mexico) with Antonio Caso. She graduated from UNAM with a degree in music and began working as a piano professor in 1916. In May 1917, when the Conservatorio Libre de Música y Declamación (Free Conservatory of Music and Declamation) opened under the direction of Antonio Caso, she began teaching there. Mexico and the United States created an academic exchange program, which allowed students to study abroad at the Institute of International Education or UNAM in 1918. Taking advantage of the program, between 1919 and 1921, Landázuri, who was teaching at UNAM took sociology courses at the University of Chicago, under pioneering scholars, George Herbert Mead, Robert Ezra Park, Albion Woodbury Small, and Frederick Starr. She joined a local Protestant church and upon completing her studies and took supplemental education courses with the Young Women's Christian Association (YWCA). Landázuri graduated with honors in philosophy in 1924.

== Career ==
=== Activism ===
Concerned about Mexican immigrants, while she was in Chicago Landázuri volunteered to work at Hull House, a settlement house which provided social services to poor and immigrant residents. Her work there, and personal relationship with Jane Addams, influenced her later decision to become a social worker. The press, at that time, frequently referred to Landázuri as the "Jane Addams of Mexico". She also worked with social reformer Mary McDowell at the University Settlement House and was a personal assistant to Grace Abbott, a social worker. She served as the official delegate for the Consejo Feminista Mexicano (Feminist Council of Mexico) to the 1921 Vienna congress of the Women's International League for Peace and Freedom (WILPF), addressing the gathering on behalf of Mexican feminists on 15 July. At the 1922 Pan-American Conference of Women held in Baltimore, Maryland, she and the writer, Antonieta Rivas Mercado, served as translators. The following year, Landázuri and women's rights activist, Elena Torres organized the Pan-American Conference of Women, which was held in Mexico City. About a hundred delegates participated in activities including lectures and discussions on women's issues including alcohol abuse, child welfare, education, employment, families headed by women, immigration, trafficking, and voting. In addition, a discussion resulted in a resolution to recommend disarmament and instruction on peace, rather than war, in order to cultivate a sense of the world community.

Caroline Duval Smith, an advisor from the US YWCA, went to Mexico City in 1922 to establish the first Mexican chapter of the organization. At the time, there was distrust regarding US intervention in Mexico. Furthermore, the Mexican government had recently secularized the country, removing the former privileges of the Catholic Church and its influences on education. Smith wanted to find a local woman to lead the Mexican YWCA and convince both Catholic and Protestant women to unite and work together to solve the social and economic problems facing families. Smith decided that Landázuri should become the first executive of the YWCA and delayed its founding until Landázuri had returned to Mexico. The Asociación Cristiana Femenina (Women's Christian Association) was formally founded in Mexico in 1923, with Landázuri as its general secretary.

Working with Smith, Landázuri created a Mothercraft Center to teach secondary and tertiary students, and poor mothers, on how to care for their children. The facility was staffed by women doctors and medical students who were assisted by YWCA volunteers. The goal was to provide severely needed medical services for the poor while simultaneously making the volunteers aware of the importance of serving the community. They also pushed the Department of Education to allow them to establish girls' clubs to teach impressionable youth the values of good citizenship. Despite their success, Landázuri resigned within six months, discouraged by the organization's focus on recruiting professional women and lack of action on women's rights issues. She became a member of the WILPF Executive Board's Peace Missions Committee in 1924 during her attendance at the WILPF Congress of Washington, D.C., serving on the executive board until 1932. In 1936, she was one of the featured speakers at a conference sponsored by the Catholic Association for International Peace in San Antonio, Texas.

=== Music ===
In 1915, Landázuri wrote the libretto for the opera Dos amores (Two Loves). The translation into Italian was made by Edoardo Trucco and the score was composed by Rafael J. Tello, one of the most noted Mexican musicians of the era. Within a year Due amori premiered during the Mexican Revolution, making Landázuri Mexico's first known woman to be a librettist. (Note: Negrete notes that sources conflict on the premiere date. According to music historian Jesús C. Romero the opera was first performed on 30 December 1915 at the Teatro Ideal (Ideal Theater) by Consuelo Escobar's Mexican-Italian Opera Company, whereas the Diccionario Enciclopédico de la Música Mexicana (Encyclopedic Dictionary of Mexican Music) by Gabriel Pareyón shows it premiered on 27 February 1916 at the Teatro Nacional (National Theater).) Throughout the 1920s, Landázuri presented lectures and folk music from Mexico to US audiences. She worked with Muna Lee in 1922 to arrange music for folk songs which Lee translated. Among the titles were "Amapolita Morada" ("Little Purple Poppy"), "El Pavu Rial" ("The Peacock"), "El Toro y el Ranchero" ("The Bull and the Cowboy"), "La Guajira" ("The Peasant Girl"), and "Tecolotito" ("The Owlet"). In 1925, she participated in a weekly radio series Know the World, which broadcast international music from WBBM in Chicago. The segment on Mexico featured Landázuri on piano and as a soprano, singing with Francisco Escalera, tenor, and an instrumental trio. In the 1930s while working in San Antonio, Texas, she resumed presenting Mexican songs to various gatherings in the state.

=== Social work ===
During José Vasconcelos's tenure as Secretary of Public Education (1921–1924), Landázuri worked on his literacy campaign and established a school for indigenous children in the State of Hidalgo. She was sent as Vanconcelos's representative to the World Conference of Educators in San Francisco, California, in 1923. The first global gathering of teachers and educational administrators, the conference included representatives of sixty nations. It set out to establish networks for distributing educational materials and develop programs for administrators which would foster understanding among peoples. Landázuri and Elena Torres also worked with rural teachers to bring issues about their salaries and teaching conditions to the attention of officials.

Landázuri assisted Robert and Greta Redfield in their landmark evaluation of the social and cultural development of Mexico in the post-revolutionary period. Sent to Mexico in 1923 with funding provided by Robert Ezra Park, a personal friend, she introduced the Redfields to Mexican intellectuals and took them to villages where they were able to evaluate pueblos battling between traditional ways of life and modernity. When they returned in 1926 to conduct their studies at Tepoztlán, the Redfields again enlisted Landázuri's help, even living with her in Mexico City for part of 1927. She was also chosen as an assistant in a study on migrants conducted by Manuel Gamio and the University of Chicago in 1926. In 1927, the Permanent Cultural Missions of the Department of Education were established and Landázuri was assigned to work in the Xocoyucan Valley, in the state of Tlaxcala. The aims of the missions were to integrate the primitive rural peasants into modern society and teach them how to run a household, behave morally, tend to the health of their children, and eliminate illiteracy. Her job was to gather data on housing, typical foods, important cultural places, and an overview of the population, while imparting basic education. She established several women's groups, choosing women who she could teach to direct and teach others. She taught them the alphabet and basic math, as well as needle crafts, cooking, and hygiene, with the hope that they would pass on the information to others.

In some places, like Ixtacuixtla, Landázuri reported that the villagers still believed that the earth was flat and in the power of sorcerers She concluded they would be unable to easily become part of a Mexican nation. In other villages, like San Jorge, she said that the women were quick to pick up the concepts she was trying to impart, and organized both an educational campaign and a plan to drill an artisan well. She took the women from San Jorge on several excursions to learn about the history of Mexico and disease. On one trip, she had them use a microscope to learn about lice and fleas so that they could understand why it was necessary to practice good hygiene and provide a healthy environment for their children. She gave demonstrations on how to cook which incorporated both principles of nutrition and basic math. In Ayecac, Landázuri had a difficult time teaching the locals because they did not speak Nahuatl and hardly spoke Spanish, but in Tepetitla she made good progress, because the villagers adopted her teachings enthusiastically. She often found the work extremely challenging and overwhelming, remarking, "El problema principal de México era lograr que la población rural adoptara una mentalidad semejante a la nuestra" ("The principal problem in Mexico is to get the rural population to adopt a mentality similar to ours").

Landázuri and other Mexican intellectuals like Rivas Mercado, Manuel Gómez Morín, Gabriela Mistral, and Miguel Palacios Macedo supported Vasconcelos when he unsuccessfully ran for President of Mexico in 1929. His defeat led Landázuri to move from teaching to social work as head of the Children's Hygiene Service of the Ministry of Health. Under her leadership, the service founded a home health nursing corps which visited clients' homes to monitor the health and nutrition of mothers and children. She worked as a researcher for the Rockefeller Foundation in the 1930s. One study undertaken in 1935 at Our Lady of the Lake College in San Antonio, Texas, evaluated the social work undertaken by the city's Catholic institutions. She wrote Children of Mexico: Their Land and Its Story with Irmagarde Richards that year. The book gave basic information on the pre- and post-conquest of Mexico, national heroes, and culture. A review in The New York Times described the book for 10-to-12-year-old readers and said that it vividly portrayed Mexican history from ancient times to modern days and would give students in the US an understanding of their neighbors to the south. In 1941, construction began on the Hospital Infantil de México (Infants Hospital of Mexico). It operated solely on an out-patient basis until July 1943. Landázuri became the librarian for medical records at the facility. The hospital treated any child who came to its doors and linked parents to social services to provide for their care. Fees for service were based on the parents' ability to pay, but lack of ability to pay did not lead to refusal of treatment.

== Death and legacy ==
Landázuri died on 10 December 1970 in Coyoacán, Mexico City, and was buried in the Panteón San Nicolás Tolentino. Enid Negrete, a researcher for the Instituto Nacional de Bellas Artes de México whose work discovered Landázuri as the first Mexican woman to be a librettist, remarked that despite her accomplishments, records on Landázuri's life were difficult to find. A brief biography of her, which recalls some of her feminist activities and social works is included in the Diccionario enciclopédico del feminismo y los estudios de género en México (Encyclopedic Dictionary of Feminism and Gender Studies in Mexico) published by UNAM in 2019. Marco Calderón Mólgora, who researched her work for the Cultural Missions, noted that Catherine Vesta Sturges, who also took part in the missions program, adopted the methods Landázuri used to train women with the goal of them training others.

== Selected works ==
- Landázuri, Elena (1922). Las mujeres ante la guerra y la paz [Women before War and Peace] (in Spanish). Barcelona, Spain: Imprenta Arissa. OCLC 78008958.
- Landázuri, Elena (September 1922). "The New Woman's Movement in Mexico". The Womans Press. Vol. XVI. New York, New York. p. 422.
- Landázuri, Elena (November 1922). "New Tendencies in the Public Instruction of Mexico". Bulletin of the Pan American Union. LII (3). Washington, D.C.: Pan American Union: 462–476.
- Landázuri, Elena (May 1924). "Why We Are Different". The Survey. LII (3). New York, New York: Survey Associates, Inc.: 159–160.
- Richards, Irmagarde; Landázuri, Elena (1935). Children of Mexico: Their Land and Its Story. San Francisco, California: Harr Wagner Publishing. OCLC 6721386.
- Collins, James Daniel (1958). El pensamiento de Kierkegaard. Translated by Landázuri, Elena. Mexico City, Mexico: Fondo de Cultura Económica. OCLC 955879577.
