= Eulalia Guzmán =

Mexican feminist (1890–1985)

- Born: Eulalia Guzmán Barrón; 12 February 1890; San Pedro Piedra Gorda, Zacatecas, Mexico
- Died: January 1, 1985 (aged 94); Mexico City, Mexico
- Occupations: educator, anthropologist, archeologist
- Years active: 1909 - 1968
- Known for: investigation of the remains of Cuauhtémoc and creation of the National Library of Anthropology and History (BNAH)

Eulalia Guzmán Barrón (1890–1985) was a pioneering feminist, educator, and nationalist thinker in post-revolutionary Mexico. She was one of the first women to work in the field of Mexican archeology. She was the lead investigator of the remains found in Ixcateopan, Guerrero, which she alleged to be those of the last Aztec Emperor, Cuauhtémoc. Three boards of inquiry on the archeological work done at the site refuted Guzmán's findings, calling her field methods into question. Her lasting legacy was the collection of Mexico's history from archives throughout the world and creation of the National Library of Anthropology and History.

== Biography ==
Eulalia Guzmán Barrón was born 12 February 1890 in San Pedro Piedra Gorda, in the Cuauhtémoc Municipality, Zacatecas, Mexico. When she was eight years old, her family moved to Mexico City. From an early age, Guzmán rejected the idea that women were destined for domesticity and was determined to become a teacher. She was awarded a grant to study at the Normal School for Teachers and graduated in 1910. Socialist schooling methods introduced in Mexico at this time from Spain radicalized many teachers of the era. From 1909 to 1914, Guzmán served as Assistant for the Normal School.

Investigation of the bones of Cuauhtémoc with Diego Rivera and Eulalia Guzmán

In 1906, she co-founded Admiradoras de Juárez (Fans of Juárez) with Hermila Galindo, Laura N. Torres, and Luz Vera to agitate for women's suffrage. Guzmán, working with Herminia Álvarez Herrera, María Arias Bernal, and Dolores Sotomayor founded the Corregidor de Querétaro Vocational School to help women improve their economic circumstances. When President Francisco I. Madero was captured, Guzmán and Arias attempted a meeting with coup leader, Victoriano Huerta, to plea for the life of the president and his vice president. The school closed upon the assassination of Madero and the women agitated for the Constitutionalists through the Club Feminil Lealtad (Women's Loyalty Club). Political involvement resulted in Guzman's firing from Miguel Lerdo de Tejada School but she quickly got work teaching classes at Fournier High School.

Her educational background spurred the Constitutionalists to send Guzmán to the United States in 1921 to investigate schools there. While in the US, Guzmán, along with Elena Torres and Julia Nava de Ruisánchez represented the Mexican Feminist Council at the 1922 League of Women Voters convention in Baltimore, and the Pan-American Conference of Women. Returning to Mexico, she taught in a rural primary school in Bácum designed for Yaqui education and also ran a night school for adults. Between 1923 and 1924, she returned to Mexico City and served as the director of the national illiteracy campaign. From 1926-1929, Guzmán studied school organizational techniques in Europe, traveling to Switzerland and Germany. Back in Mexico, she obtained a master's degree in philosophy in 1933, from the School of Advanced Studies at UNAM.

She participated in the excavation of Tomb 7 of Monte Albán in 1933 with Alfonso Caso and in 1934 was one of the first to study the pre-Columbian site of Chalcatzingo. She was appointed to serve as the Director of the Department of Archaeology of the National Museum in 1934 and two years later was commissioned to visit museums and libraries in Europe and the US in search of documentation on Mexican history. She studied and traveled until 1940 creating a cataloged record of more than 3 thousand documents which were placed in the custody of Instituto Nacional de Antropología e Historia (INAH) (National Institute of Anthropology and History). Guzman created the historical archive of the Biblioteca Nacional de Antropología e Historia (BNAH) (National Library of Anthropology and History). In 1942 she explored the archaeological sites of Izapa and Comitán in Chiapas and her own birthplace, San Pedro Piedra Gorda. Guzmán was appointed to head the historical archives of INAH in 1944 and held that position until her retirement in 1968. During this time she was studying and graduated in 1945 with a degree in archeology, working on a film project on Latin America with Walt Disney Studios, and excavating sites in Chachoapam, Nochistlán, Tamazulapan, Teposcolula and Yanhuitlán. In 1949, Guzmán was sent to investigate reports that the remains of the Aztec Emperor, Cuauhtémoc had been found in the village of Ixcateopan, Guerrero.

Guzmán examined the documents purporting to have been from a Franciscan priest and believing them to be authentic began an excavation of the main church at Ixcateopan. She discovered bones which she declared to belong to Cuauhtémoc. Initially scholars congratulated Guzmán, but after an examination was conducted by INAH to confirm the findings, Guzmán's authentication was rejected. Public outcry brought prominent citizens of the indigenismo movement, including Diego Rivera and others, to support Guzman's conclusions that the bones in the ossuary were authentic. The Secretariat of Public Education (SEP) empaneled a "Grand Commission" composed of some of Mexico's most prominent scholars including Arturo Arnáiz y Freg, Alfonso Caso, Manuel Gamio, José Gómez Robleda and Manuel Toussaint for a second review. Their findings concluded the documents were forged, the bones were recent, and they reprimanded Guzmán for her methods.

Guzmán and others published numerous articles to refute the findings of the commission. The intellectual and scholarly community divided into the camp that supported Guzman and the camp that did not. In an effort to finally put the controversy to an end, a fourth commission was established in 1976 by president Luis Echeverría. Guillermo Bonfil Batalla, general director of INAH, assembled archeologists, architects, anthropologists, forensic examiners, and historians, who evaluated the archeological materials, re-excavated the site and re-examined the documentation. Their conclusions mirrored previous findings that the bones and claims were a hoax. Guzmán's loss of impartiality, though condemned by academia, did not dampen her popularity with native populations, who have honored her with festivals and renamed the town square in her honor.

She died on 1 January 1985 in Mexico City.

== Selected publications ==
- La escuela nueva o de la accion (1923). (In Spanish)
- Caracteres esenciales del arte antiguo mexicano: su sentido fundamental (1932) (In Spanish)
- Los relieves de las rocas del cerro de la Cantera, Jonacatepec, Morelos (1934) (In Spanish)
- Exploracion arqueologica en la Mixteca Alta (1934) (In Spanish)
- "Un "yugo" totonaco de Medellín, Ver" Boletín del Museo Nacional de Arqueología, Historia y Etnología, Epoca 6a, T. 1 (1934) (In Spanish)
- Un manuscrito de la colección Boturini que trata de los antiguos Señores de Teotihuacán (1938) (In Spanish)
- "The Art of Map-Making among the Ancient Mexicans" Imago Mundi Vol. 3 (1939): 1-6. (In English)
- Lo que vi y oí (1941) (In Spanish)
- Letter to Jaime Torres Bodet, 1950, and short papers on the tomb of Cuauhtémoc (1950) (In English)
- with Alfonso Caso. La genealogía y biografía de Cuauhtemoc: refutación a las afirmaciones del grupo oponente de la llamada Gran Comisión (1954) (In Spanish)
- Cuauhtémoc; datos biograficos y cronologicos segun la historia y la tradicion de Ixcateopan (1955) (In Spanish)
- Relaciones de Hernán Cortés a Carlos V sobre la invasión de Anáhuac (1958) (In Spanish)
- Pruebas y dictámenes sobre la autenticidad de los restos de Cuauhtémoc (1962) (In Spanish)
- Mexico, sus antiguos pobladores (1963) (In Spanish)
- Manuscritos sobre México en archivos de Italia {1964) (In Spanish)
- Moctezuma Xocoyotzin (1966) (In Spanish)
- Ichcateopan, la tumba de Cuauhtemoc : héroe supremo de la historia de México. [Tradición oral, documentos, los dictamenes negativos, los concluyentes estudios químicos, antropológicos, históricos, matemáticos, anatómicos, paleográficos (1973) (In Spanish)
