= Sara Velasco Gutiérrez =

Mexican writer and teacher (born 1945)

Sara Velasco
- Born: Sara Velasco Gutiérrez; 13 September 1945 (age 81); Guadalajara, Jalisco, Mexico
- Occupations: Writer, literary researcher, librarian, former high school teacher
- Children: 3
- Writing career
- Language: Spanish

Sara Velasco Gutiérrez (born 13 September 1945) is a Mexican writer, literary researcher, librarian, and former elementary education and high school teacher.

== Biography ==
Sara Velasco was born in Guadalajara, Jalisco, Mexico, on 13 September 1945. Her parents were María Trinidad Gutiérrez Magaña, from Ciudad Guzmán, Jalisco, and Joaquín Velasco Saldívar, from the town of Tabasco, in the Mexican state of Zacatecas.

She studied to become an elementary education teacher, at the Escuela Normal de Jalisco (Normal School of Jalisco), where ended her studies in 1963, and obtained her professional license No. 113952 in 1965.

Sara Velasco could not find a job as a teacher in Guadalajara, so moved to Mexico City, but before went to say goodbye to her teachers at the Faculty of Philosophy and Letters of the University of Guadalajara, Adalberto Navarro Sánchez and Arturo Rivas Sainz. Upon returning to Guadalajara, she re-enrolled in the aforementioned Faculty, and also went to teach classes at Preparatory School No. 3 (high school). A few years later, studied journalism at the Universidad Femenina de Guadalajara.

In the 1960s she produced almost 400 biobibliographical records of writers native to or residing in Jalisco from the 19th century to 1965, including those who were alive at that time, when she was dedicating herself to developing the task that she had set for herself. The University of Guadalajara, due to the great extension of the text penned by Sara, divided the work into two volumes. The first took three years to be published, and the second another three. The way of writing it was to follow the methodology for literature texts for secondary education in force in those years: a very brief biography of each author, and selection of fragments. The title was suggested by her professor Adalberto Navarro Sánchez: Escritores de Jalisco (Writers From Jalisco).

During one of her lectures, she said that as far as the 19th century was concerned, she could only find, in archives, newspaper libraries, and libraries, texts, poems, data, and biobibliographical information about four Jaliscan female writers, who were the following: Isabel Prieto de Landázuri, Esther Tapia de Castellanos, Antonia Vallejo, and Refugio Barragán de Toscano.

In her interventions as a librarian, in addition to holding that position in the State Network of Public Libraries of Jalisco, Sara Velasco gives lectures on the subject. For example, on 21 July 2004, she gave a lecture on the importance of the work of librarians.

Over the years, she has created the Biblioteca de Autores Jaliscienses (Library of Jaliscan Authors), currently housed by the "Professor Ramón García Ruiz" Central Library of the State of Jalisco. She is a numerary member of the Sociedad Mexicana de Geografía y Estadística, Capítulo Jalisco (Mexican Society for Geography and Statistics, Chapter Jalisco), the Association of Municipal Chroniclers of Jalisco, and the Mexican Association of Librarians.

== Works ==
- Escritores jaliscienses (Writers From Jalisco), University of Guadalajara, Guadalajara, 1982
- Algunos escritores jaliscienses olvidados (Some Forgotten Jaliscan Writers), La Zonámbula, Guadalajara
- Retrocediendo sobre mis pasos. Episodios autobiográficos (Retracing my Steps. Autobiographical Episodes), University of Guadalajara / Society of Natural Sciences of Jalisco / Editorial Ágata / El Informador, Guadalajara, 2005
- Muestrario de letras en Jalisco, Vol. 6 (Collection of Samples of Letters in Jalisco), Impre-Jal, Guadalajara, 2007
- Bajo el purísimo cielo de Jalisco: cuatro escritoras del siglo XIX (Under the Purest Sky of Jalisco: Four Female Writers of the 19th Century), Secretaría de Cultura del Gobierno de Jalisco, Guadalajara, 2015 ISBN 9786077340416
- Los peculiares libros de Álvaro Leonor Ochoa (The Peculiar Books of Álvaro Leonor Ochoa) (compiler), Secretaría de Cultura del Gobierno de Jalisco, Guadalajara, 2017 ISBN 9786077341222 OCLC 1108320421
