= Herminia Álvarez Herrera =

- Born: Natividad Herminia Álvarez Herrera; 1888; Santa María del Oro, Durango, Mexico
- Died: 1955 (aged 66–67); Mexico City, Mexico
- Occupations: revolutionary, educator, feminist

Natividad Herminia Álvarez Herrera (1888–1955) was a Mexican Revolutionary War veteran, propagandist and personal tutor and governess for the children of Venustiano Carranza. She was the founder of the Confederación Femenil Mexicana.

== Biography ==
Natividad Herminia Álvarez Herrera was born in 1888 Santa María del Oro, Durango, Mexico. She joined the Revolution in 1910 as a propagandist. She joined the Mexican Revolution supporting Francisco I. Madero, but on his assassination in 1913, joined the anti-Huerta Women's Loyalty Club, participating in demonstrations distributing propaganda for the Constitutionalists with María Arias Bernal. That same year, her sister Concepción also joined the Revolutionary forces.

Álvarez, working with Arias Bernal, Eulalia Guzmán, and Dolores Sotomayor founded the Corregidor de Querétaro Vocational School to help women improve their economic circumstances. In 1914, Carranza appointed Álvarez as the private governess and teacher of his children.

After the overthrow of Huerta, Carranza gave Álvarez several commissions to interview revolutionary leaders in various states. Carranza also traveled with a group of teachers and professionals who he trusted to reform and reconstruct society by way of education and propaganda. He sent 44 teachers to Puebla, 27 to Querétaro, 4 to Tabasco, 20 to Yucatán, 5 to disseminate propaganda to General Obregon's army, and 27 teachers traveled with him. Álvarez was part of the group accompanying Carranza to Veracruz. In 1916, she was honored with a diploma for her revolutionary merit.

Álvarez founded the Confederación Femenil Mexicana (Mexican Women's Confederation). In the creation of the Mexican Women's Confederation in 1931 the communist women, including Cuca García and Concha Michel were vocal about exploitation. They wanted measures to counter exploitation of Mexican women, including their access to education, free agency placements, restaurants for employees and workers, communal housing, health care for workers, a legal department, to female attendants, and protectionist laws.

In 1933 she joined the National Revolutionary Party. That same year she participated in the second National Congress of Workers and Peasants. Álvarez died in Mexico City in 1955.
