= Sadie L. Adams =

African-American suffragette and club woman

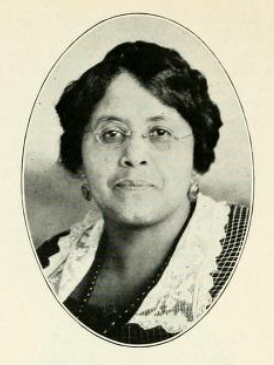
- Adams, circa 1922
- Born: Sarah C. Lewis; February 24, 1872; Staunton, Augusta County, Virginia
- Died: July 30, 1945 (aged 73); Chicago, Illinois
- Other names: Sadie Lewis Adams
- Occupations: teacher, women's rights advocate
- Children: 3

Sadie L. Adams (February 24, 1872 – July 30, 1945) was an African-American teacher, suffragist, and clubwoman. She was one of the first women to serve on an election board in Chicago and one of the founders of the Douglas League of Women Voters. In 1916, she served as a delegate from Chicago's first black suffrage organization, the Alpha Suffrage Club, to the National Equal Rights League conference. She was elected president of the Chicago and Northern District Association of Colored Women's Clubs in 1921, serving into 1934. She was also involved in various charity clubs and organizations that helped to engage women in war work during World War I, provide resources for underserved youth, and increase suffrage for Black women.

== Early life ==
Sarah C. Lewis was born on February 24, 1872, in Staunton, Augusta County, Virginia, to Fanny (née Mosby/Moseby) and William W. Lewis. She was one of the couple's three children. She had a sister, Cora (later Keyes) and a brother, Delaware. From her youth, she was involved in the John Wesley AME Church. She was as a Sunday school teacher and served as president of the Sunday school board. After attending public school in Staunton, Lewis went on to earn a teaching certificate from Hartshorn Memorial College in Richmond.

== Career ==
Returning to her hometown, Lewis began teaching in the Staunton Public School system, where she worked until her marriage. On June 1, 1892, she married James P. Adams. The couple had three children: James Cornelius (born 1895), Sarah Neta Lucile "Lucille" (born 1901) and Amelia Frances (born 1904). The couple had moved to Baltimore, Maryland by 1901, when Adams became a congregant and had her son baptized at St. Katherine of Alexandria, a "colored mission" of the Mount Calvary Church. In 1910, the family moved to Chicago and Adams joined St. Thomas Episcopal Church.

== Activism and club activities ==
Black neighborhoods in Chicago at the time lacked significant resources, particularly for Black youth, and Adams was dedicated to fixing these gaps as well as bringing about overall "social improvement." She served as the secretary and president of the Dorcas Society, her church's charity organization as well as in the Woman's Home Missionary Society, as recording secretary and became an active clubwoman. Twice a week, she worked at Provident Hospital, weighing and recording statistics on babies served as the President of the Baby's Relief Club. She later served the treasurer of the Inter-Racial Cooperative Committee of Chicago, which raised funds to maintain the Amanda Smith Industrial School for Girls in Harvey, Illinois. She later served as a trustee on the school's board. In order to directly address the issues affecting Black youth, Adams served as a member of the Women's City Club and Y.W.C.A. She realized the importance of the Black women's leadership and served as both a judge and a clerk at the Illinois Home and Aid Society Board. She also worked with the Esther Social Register a club whose role was to entertain visiting Black celebrities.

She was also involved with the Gaudemaus Charity Club. In 1912 served as a delegate to the NACW convention on behalf of the Charity Club. Furthermore, in 1916, following the death of the previous secretary, Adams was appointed secretary of the organization. Adams was heavily involved in club activities and was described by the Chicago Defender as "untiring and enthusiastic" when it came to her club work.

=== Involvement with the Alpha Suffrage Club ===
Adams joined the Alpha Suffrage Club, the nation's black women's suffrage association and within one year of its 1913 founding had become a club officer, serving as its corresponding secretary. Illinois women won the right to vote in local elections in 1914 and Adams was one of the first black women to serve on the election board. Creating an influential voting block in the form of Black women by implementing "a block system" to knock doors had been a priority of the club during Adam's tenure as secretary. In 1916, she attended the National Equal Rights League Conference held in Washington, D.C, as a delegate for the Alpha Suffrage Club, ⁣ for which she served as vice president, under Ida B. Wells' presidency. She was "the only delegate from the state of Illinois" and also attended two conferences of the Illinois Equal Suffrage League as the Alpha Club's delegate.

=== Charity work during World War I ===
When her son, James volunteered for service during World War I, Adams began volunteering one day a week with the State Council of Defense to enroll women in war work. A bugler in the war, James was wounded and gassed before being honorably discharged. Adams also served on the committee that helped welcome home the 370th infantry from battle. She was a key organizer of the Women's Mass Meeting for Peace held on February 23, 1938. At the end of the war, she was honored with an armband for her service from the women's committee of the Council of Defense.

=== Continuation of voting rights work ===
At the conclusion of the war, she returned to her work on suffrage and attended the organizational conference in 1920 of the League of Women Voters (LWV), held in Chicago. In 1921, Adams was elected president of the Chicago and Northern District Association of Colored Women's Clubs, having previously served the organization as parliamentarian and vice president, and would serve through the 1933–34 term. Following her term as president, she served as chairwoman of peace and international relations for the Association. She was one of the founders of the Douglas League of Women Voters and was selected as a delegate to the Pan-American Conference of Women held in April 1922 in Baltimore. She was the only Black woman from Illinois present at the conference.

In 1923, Adams was invited by the Illinois League of Women Voters to represent the Illinois Federation of Colored Women's Clubs at a conference organized to discuss the Sheppard–Towner Act. The Act had been passed in 1920 to provide federal welfare legislation to protect children and maternity and a framework of state and federal cooperation in its implementation. The National LWV supported the act, but it was controversial because it required states to match the federal contributions to the program and organize implementation.

Given her active role in these pursuits, Adams became recognized as a leader in the suffrage movement. She filled both the role of chairperson and vice president of the National Association of Colored Women, and in these roles she facilitated dialogue between white and black women organizing around women's rights. In 1924, the National Association of Colored Women (NACW) held their 14th Convention in Chicago and Adams not only chaired the committee organizing the arrangements, but also presented the keys to the city to Hallie Q. Brown, the NACW president.

== Death and legacy ==
Adams died on July 30, 1945, at Presbyterian Hospital in Chicago. She is remembered as an influential Black suffragist who leveraged her relative privilege as part of the “Black elite” in favor of progressive values and as a dedicated worker for women and children's benevolent societies in Chicago. She was profiled by the Chicago Defender, a Black newspaper based in Chicago, which compared her to Sojourner Truth, Harriet Tubman, and other highly influential Black activists.
