= Pastoriza Flores =

Ecuadorian educator

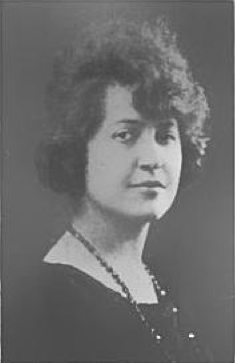
- Pastoriza Flores, 1921
- Born: Pastoriza Flores de Handel; 2 May 1897; Quito, Ecuador
- Died: 7 May 1937
- Occupation: Educator
- Known for: First Ecuadorean woman to earn a Ph.D. from an American university

Pastoriza Flores (Pastoriza Flores de Hendel) (2 May 1897 - 7 May 1937) was an Ecuadorian educator. She was the first Ecuadorean woman student to hold the degree of Ph.D. from an American university, and she was awarded it at the age of twenty-four.

== Biography ==
Born in Quito, she studied at the Colegio Manuela Canizares, one of the large schools for girls, which corresponded closely to US teachers' training schools. At fifteen, she secured a government scholarship, which enabled her to come to North America to complete her education. Only six women had won this scholarship, while the Government of Ecuador has sent 70 men to study in northern universities. Flores earned an A. B. with a major in history from Hunter College, afterwards becoming an instructor at the school in Spanish. For the year 1919-1920, she was awarded a Curtis University Scholarship in history at Columbia University, where she received the degree of A. M. and a teacher's diploma in history in 1920. While at Columbia, she studied under Professors Shepherd, Dunning, Hazen, Schuyler, Kendrick, Johnson and Giddings. Her Ph.D. thesis at Columbia was History of the boundary dispute between Ecuador and Peru.

Flores was active as Chairman of the Hispanic American Bureau of the Intercollegiate Cosmopolitan Club. She provided for the education of her two younger sisters, whom she has brought to the US, waiting to return to Ecuador when she could take them with her. "Isn't it better for Ecuador that three of us be trained as educators than that I go back immediately and alone attempt to bring the ways of North America to my countrywomen? It is my fondest dream to help arouse the women of all South America —not just of Ecuador—to take their part in the political and social life of their countries." She was a delegate at the Pan-American Conference of Women. She married James Hendel.
