= Madeleine Lemoyne Ellicott =

American suffragette

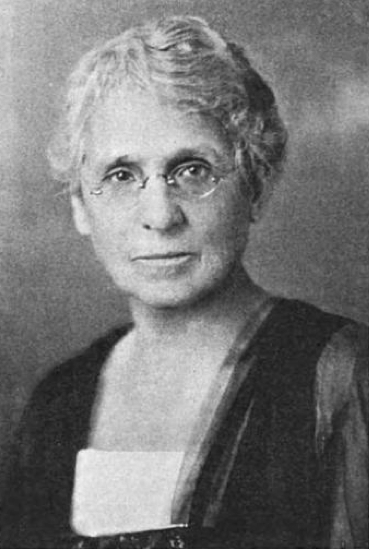
- Born: Madeleine Romaine Lemoyne; November 14, 1856; Chicago, Illinois, U.S.
- Died: August 25, 1945 (aged 88); Baltimore, Maryland, U.S.
- Occupation: Suffragette
- Known for: Founder, League of Women Voters of Maryland

Madeleine Romaine Lemoyne, Mrs. Charles E. Ellicott (14 Nov 1856–25 Aug 1945) was an American suffragist. She was the founder of the League of Women Voters of Maryland, serving as its president for 20 years, longer than anyone else.

== Life ==
Born in Chicago, Ellicott studied chemistry at Rush Medical College, and then continued her studies at the Polytechnic in Zürich, Switzerland. In conjunction with the annual National League of Women Voters meeting planned for Baltimore in 1922, she was one of the organizers of the Pan-American Conference of Women.

She married Charles Ellis Ellicott in 1890. They had three sons, Charles Ellis Ellicott, Jr. (born 1892), Valcoulon Lemoyne Ellicott (born 1893), and John Roman Ellicott (born 1896).
