= Carmen de Pinillos =

Peruvian writer, editor, and translator

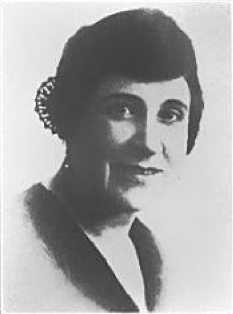
Carmen de Pinillos

Carmen Torres Calderón de Pinillos (1909–1943) was a Peruvian writer, editor, and translator.

== Biography ==
She was born in Peru in 1909 and died in New York City in 1943. She was educated in a convent, but continued her studies after leaving the convent.

Marrying a well-to-do man, she left her girlhood home at Trujillo, Peru and moved near Lima. When her husband lost his fortune, she became a fashion editor of a bi-monthly magazine, the Illustracion Peruana, and then editor of a magazine for children. The small magazine met with unprecedented success, and she eventually tried writing original articles, and translating French and Italian novels for the daily papers. Pinillos never used her own name. "It would have hurt the papers and magazines," she explained, "to have it known that the articles—except the fashion articles— were written by a woman, and besides, it was never done." When the editor of Illustracion died, Pinillos took his place, editing the magazine for a year, but still secretly. Later the magazine was discontinued. Seeing no literary future for herself in her own country, Pinillos came to the United States— "where women could work'"—bringing with her a little daughter.

Her work began in New York City with the Butterick Publishing Company, in the Spanish edition of their fashion sheet. She went on to do translations, both newspaper articles and pamphlets published by the Carnegie Endowment for International Peace. She ten edited Revista del Mundo, the Spanish edition of The World's Work before she became editor of Inter America. She continued translating contemporary fiction into Spanish, including a translation of the five volumes of Frank Simonds' History of the World War (Historia de la guerra del mundo). She represented the American Association for International Conciliation at the Pan American Union.
