= Julia Nava de Ruisánchez =

Mexican activist, writer

Julia Nava de Ruisánchez, also Ruiz Sánchez, (2 February 1883 – 2 May 1964) was a Mexican writer and an activist during the Mexican Revolution. She is also remembered for establishing the first Mexican institution for training social workers in 1936.

== Biography ==
Born in 1883 in Galeana, Nuevo León, Nava attended the state's teachers' training college and in 1900, became headmistress of the high school in Tula, Tamaulipas. In 1904, she helped establish La Sociedad Protectora de la Mujer, known for being Mexico City's oldest feminist society. In 1909, in Mexico City, she took part in activities opposing the government of Porfirio Díaz. Together with Dolores Jiménez Muro, she drafted anti-government articles in Cuautla and other cities in the state of Morelos. In 1910, she and Muro founded the Club Femenil Antirreeleccionista Hijas de Cuauhtémoc (Anti-Reelectionist Women's Club: Daughters of Cuauhtémoc). The arrest of her husband was hastened by the meetings that she organized at their house. She contributed to opposition newspapers in Mexico City including Diario del Hogar. In 1913, she fought against Victoriano Huerta earning the title of Veteran of the Revolution. She was working as a teacher, but she was also distributing seditious pamphlets in the city that had been printed by María Arias Bernal. She and Muro also wrote a manifesto against Huerta, Aureliano Blanquet and Félix Díaz. Eventually, the two of them left the state capital to become Zapatistas and to raise money for their cause. Muro was made a colonel whilst she was put in charge of communication with the forces in Teziutlan. They were both commissioned to carry out tasks by Emiliano Zapata

She is also remembered for founding the Centro Feminista Mexicano, the country's first feminist association, and for being an organizer of the Club Femenil Antireeleccionista "Hijas de Cuauhtemoc", a group of revolutionary women opposed to the re-election of Bernardo Reyes. Because of her defense of the maderism movement and for her public condemnation of General Victoriano Huerta, Nava was put in jail. Upon her release, she continued to oppose Huerta and continued to support the idea of a society led by workers.

Nava was an active member of the Consejo Feminista Mexicano (Mexican Feminist Council) where she edited the fortnightly journal, La mujer y la vida (Woman and Life) from 1921. In 1922, together with María Penteria Meza, she represented the Feminist Council at the Pan-American Women's Conference in Baltimore which was also attended by the Mexican delegates Elena Torres, Eulalia Guzmán, and Luz Vera.

== Contribution to social work ==
Nava founded Mexico's first educational institution for social work, the Escuela de Enseñanza Doméstica (Domestic Education School). Preparatory work had started in 1926 but official recognition came only on 2 February 1933. In that year, the Secretariat of Public Education founded a social study program, and Nava taught it. The school was inspired by Nava's visit to the USA where she had been in touch with schools for social workers. Thanks to the impetus of the school, the profession became recognized in Mexico as women began to take up employment as social workers in 1936.

== Selected works ==
In addition to her essays and journal articles, Julia Nava de Ruisánchez published the following:

- 1923: Mis cuentos, México, Cultura
- 1935: Dramatizaciones de leyenda mexicanas y cuentos populares, México, 1935
