= Chicago and Northern District Association of Colored Women's Clubs =

- Formation: 1921
- Founder: Irene Gaines
- Founded at: Chicago
- Type: Woman's club
- Formerly called: City Federation of Colored Women's Clubs

The Chicago and Northern District Association of Colored Women's Clubs (CNDA) was a woman's club formed in 1906 under the name the City Federation of Colored Women's Clubs (CFCWC). Its member clubs belonged to the Illinois Federation of Colored Women's Clubs (IFCWC). Mrs. Cordelia West contacted women's club presidents in Chicago to join together to work more effectively to solve the problems facing the African-American community. Its motto was "From Possibilities to Realities" and Cordelia West served as the first president .

The original clubs were:

- The Cornell Charity Club
- The Frederick Douglass Woman's Club
- The Ida B. Wells Club
- The Imperial Art Club
- The Julia Gaston Club
- The Ladies' Labor of Love Club
- The Mother's Union Club
- The Necessity Club
- The North Side Women's Club
- The Phyllis Wheatley Club
- The Progressive Circle of Kings Daughters
- The Volunteer Workers Club
- The West Side Women's Club
- The Women's Civic League

In 1921, during the presidency of Irene Gaines the City Federation of Colored Women's Clubs was incorporated under the name the Chicago and Northern District Association of Colored Women's Clubs. Sadie L. Adams was elected in that year as the president and served until 1933. Along with the new name came increased membership, establishment of a club house, and the creation of a home for dependent children.

Presidents of the CFCWC include Annie Peyton, Fannie Turner, Therese G. Macon, Clara Johnson, Jessie Johnson, and Martha Walton. The club celebrated its golden jubilee in 1956 and its diamond jubilee in 1981.
