= Valeria H. Parker =

American physician and suffragette

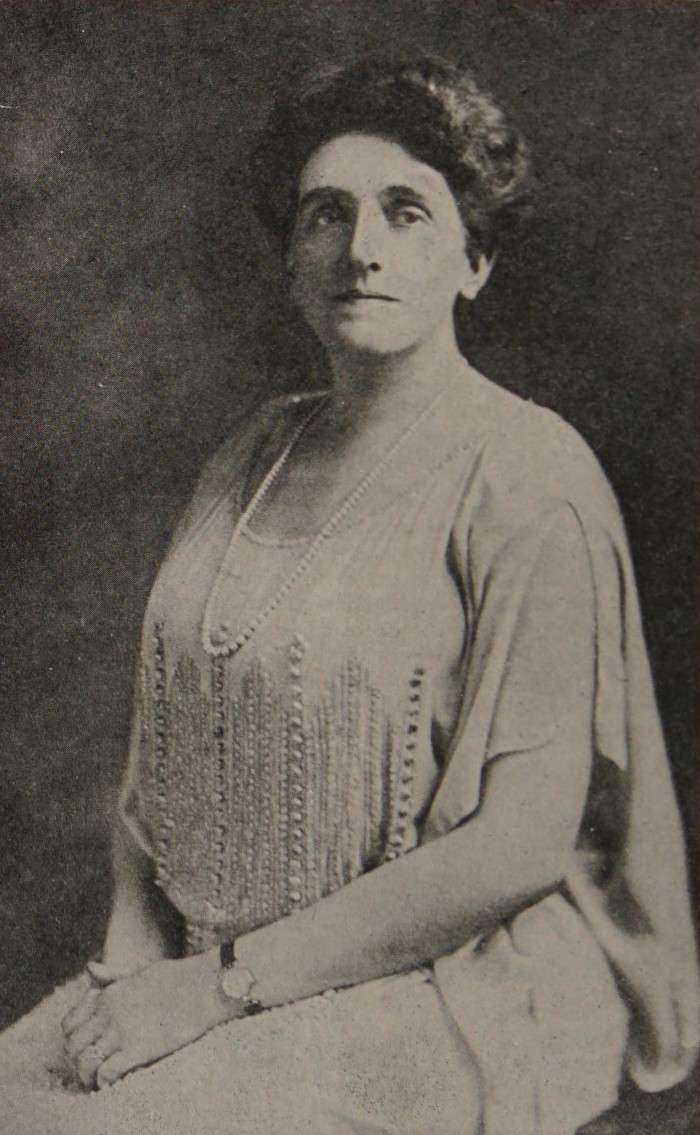
- Dr. Valeria H. Parker
- Born: Valeria Hopkins; February 11, 1879; Chicago, Illinois
- Died: October 25, 1959 (aged 80); Hartford, Connecticut
- Education: Oxford College (AB); Hering Medical College (MD)
- Occupation: Physician
- Spouse: Edward O. Parker (m. 1905)

Valeria Hopkins Parker (February 11, 1879 – October 25, 1959) was an American physician and suffragette. A governor appointee as director of the Connecticut State Farm for Women (1919), she was the first "woman policeman ever to be given supervision over state policemen in the US", these being policewomen who supervised girls in the New London, Connecticut area. Among her other achievements, she was also the Executive Secretary of the US Interdepartmental Social Hygiene Board.

== Biography ==
Born in Chicago, Illinois in 1879, she was the daughter of Anson S. and Martha (Loath) Hopkins. She graduated from Hyde Park High School (1895), receiving a prize in an oratorical contest; Oxford College, Ohio, A.B. degree, 1898; Hering Medical College, Chicago, M.D., 1902. She married Edward O. Parker, M.D. in Holyoke, Massachusetts on November 26, 1905; there were children: Mason (b. June 29, 1907); Leath (b. Jan. 9, 1909). She traveled in Europe for three years after taking a medical degree. She spent some time in Davos Platz, Switzerland, with a patient. She was a member of the Pen and Brush Club of N.T.; actively interested in the founding of Emily Bruce House, a home for children; especially interested in sex and social hygiene, special physiology class in the Lanier School-in-the-Woods.

Actively interested in anything pertaining to the welfare of women and children. Delivered special lectures to senior girls at Rosemary Hall on "The Physiology of Life," June 1912 and 1913. Favored woman suffrage; member of the Greenwich Equal Franchise League, founded at her home, August 1909 (1st vice president, 1909–11; president, 1911–12; later treasurer). Press chairman of Connecticut Woman Suffrage Association, 1910–11. Wrote for various newspapers and publications, and addresses delivered in various places, notably article on the International Congress of Eugenics in London (Woman's Journal, September 1912). Congregationalism member, Mothers' Club, Travel Club, Alliance Française, United Workers, Housewives' League, Consumers' League, Connecticut Society of Social Hygiene; visitor for Connecticut Children's Aid Society; chairman Emily Bruce House Committee; member Greenwich College Women's Club. She also served as the Assistant Educational Director, American Social Hygiene Association; Director, Social Morality Department, National Women's Christian Union; and National Chairman, Social Hygiene Committee, National League of Women Voters.

== Selected works ==
- Social hygiene and the child (1939)
- First aid for adolescence (1937)
