= Laura N. Torres =

Mexican journalist

Laura N. Torres was an early twentieth century Mexican journalist and founder of an early feminist organization.

In 1904, Torres founded a feminist society named Admiradoras de Juárez. Admiradoras de Juárez is described as a militant feminist society that demanded an end to sexual discrimination and repressive government. The organization that Torres founded was criticized by the contemporary historian Justo Sierra, who said it was a refuge for old, ugly women were trying to imitate men.
