= American Association for International Conciliation =

American Association for International Conciliation (AAIC) was an American publisher and organization focused on international peace. It was the U.S. branch of the Association for International Conciliation.

== History ==
The AAIC was organized in 1907 and incorporated in 1909, with its headquarters in New York City. It was not organized on a membership basis, but had a mailing list of some 18,000 subscribers to its monthly publication, International Conciliation.

== Objectives ==
The particular objects of the Association were, "to record, preserve and disseminate the history of organized efforts for promoting international peace and relations of comity and good fellowship between nations; to print and circulate documents and otherwise to aid individual citizens, the newspaper press, and organizations of various kinds to obtain accurate information and just views upon these subjects; and to promote in all practicable ways mutual understanding and good feeling between the American people and those of other nations."
