= Manuel Gamio =

Mexican anthropologist

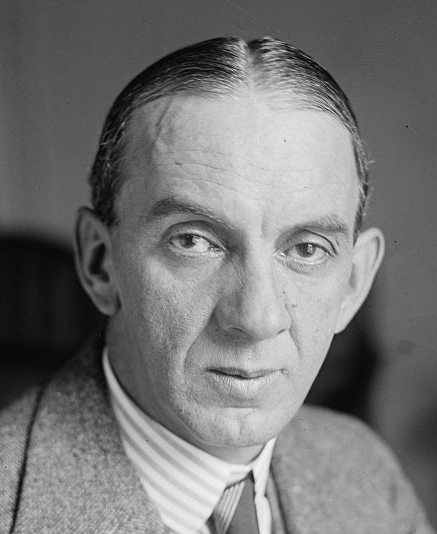
Manuel Gamio

Manuel Gamio (1883–1960) was a Mexican anthropologist, archaeologist, sociologist, and a leader of the indigenismo movement. Although he rejected full sovereignty for indigenous communities in Mexico, he argued that their self-governing organizations, such as tribal governments, municipal organizations, and elected community leaders should be recognized and respected. He also contributed to efforts by Mexican immigrant laborers in the United States to organize and create Mexican communities in the United States. He is often considered as the father of modern anthropological studies in Mexico. He devised a well-known system for classifying the hunter-gatherers of Central America.

== Education ==
Gamio was born in Mexico City, where he studied engineering at the School of Mining. He studied archaeology, ethnology, and anthropology with Nicolás León and Jesús Galindo y Villa at the International School of American Archaeology and Ethnology (established in 1911 at the Museo Nacional de Antropología in Mexico City). At age 19 he left his studies to work on a family rubber plantation, where the states of Oaxaca, Veracruz and Puebla join. There he learned Nahuatl from the plantation workers and developed a strong interest in Mexico's indigenous cultures.

He returned to study at the National Museum under Zélia Nuttall, who in 1909 sent him to study under Franz Boas at Columbia University. There he earned a Ph.D. From Boas he adopted the cultural approach characteristic of the anthropology of the United States in the twentieth century. Boas considered Gamio one of his best students.

== Work in Mexico and Guatemala ==
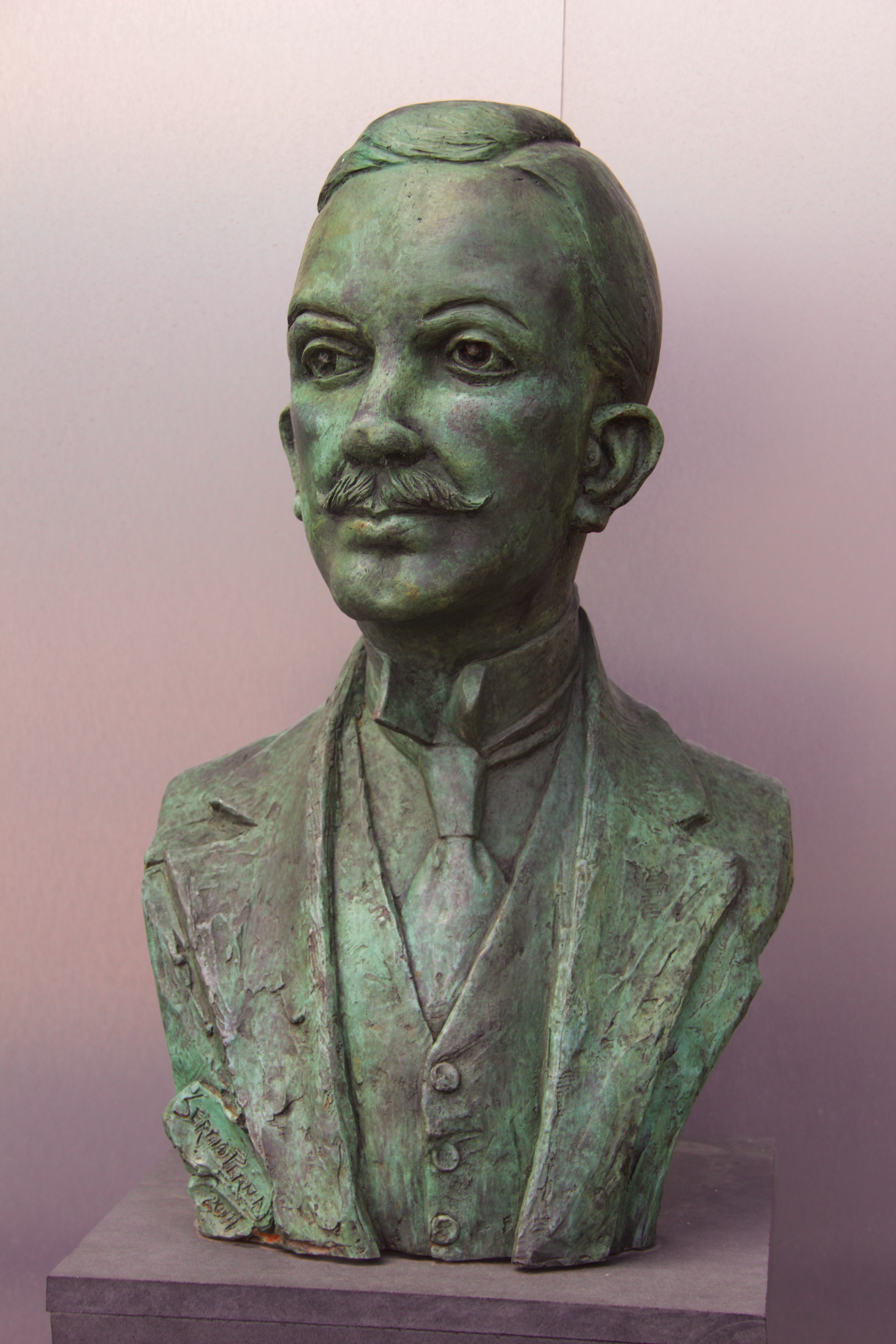
Statue at Templo Mayor, Mexico City

He was the first scientific investigator to explore Teotihuacan. A result of these investigations was the book La población del valle de Teotihuacan (The Population of the Valley of Teotihuacan), published in 1922. A revision of his Columbia thesis, this work is still an important source for ethnographic information on the northern zone of the State of Mexico. He also produced some documentary films. He estimated the maximum population of Teotihuacan at 300,000. He criticized the Mexican census for classifying Spanish-speaking Indians as whites and those married by traditional rites as single.

Earlier, in 1916, he had published the important book Forjando patria: pro nacionalismo (Forging a Fatherland), a treatise on cultural assimilation of indigenous Mexicans into the racially mixed society of the country. Other works in Spanish include Hacia un México nuevo (1935) and Consideraciones sobre el problema del indigenismo (1948).

In the 1920s he investigated the highlands of Guatemala, near the cities of Quiche, Huehuetenango and Quetzaltenango, concentrating on pottery styles. Due to the similarity of pottery from Guatemala and central Mexico, Gamio believed the latter area to be the original source of Maya civilization. He hypothesized that some of the early natives of central Mexico abandoned that area in search of a place free of earthquakes and volcanos.

Gamio's publications on Mexico's indigenous were important for "reinstating Anahuac as the glorious foundation of Mexican history and culture." Gamio was one among many, including President Lázaro Cárdenas in the 1930s, who worked for the integration of the indigenous into national life.

== Work in the United States ==
In 1925, he emigrated to the United States after denouncing corruption in the Mexican Ministry of Education. He concentrated on the subjects of migration and labor involving Mexicans in the United States, for the Social Science Research Council in Washington, D.C. Gamio published two books on this research – Mexican Immigration to the United States (1930) and The Mexican Immigrant: His Life Story (1931) – this time in English. These books have only recently been translated into Spanish for the use of present-day Mexican anthropologists and sociologists.

He returned to Mexico in 1930, where he held various government positions, conducted sociological and applied anthropological investigations, and directed the Inter-American Indian Institute from its foundation in 1942 until his death in 1960.
