= Isabel Prieto de Landázuri =

Spanish poet and dramatist

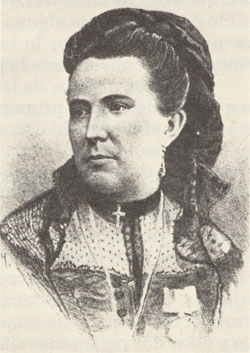
- Born: Isabel Ángela Prieto González Bango; 1 March 1833; Alcázar de San Juan, Spain
- Died: 28 September 1876 (aged 43); Hamburg, Germany
- Occupations: Poet, dramatist
- Notable work: Los dos son peores
- Spouse: Pedro Landázuri Diez

Isabel Ángela Prieto González Bango (1 March 1833 – 28 September 1876), better known as Isabel Prieto de Landázuri, was a Spanish poet and dramatist, considered "one of the first women to enter the literary canon of Mexico in the 19th century," since this country was where she created most of her literary legacy.

== Biography ==
There are disagreements regarding the birthplace of Isabel Prieto de Landázari; although most consider that she was born in Alcázar de San Juan, Ciudad Real, Spain, in 1833, some writers like the Spanish Julio Cejador y Frauca determined that she was actually born in Mexico City. There are yet other sources that say that she was born in 1828 in Spanish territory. She was the daughter of the Panamanian Sotero Prieto Olasagarre (at that time, Panama was under Spanish rule) and the Spaniard Isabel González Bango de la Puebla, and she was the oldest of their eleven children.

At age four, Prieto's family moved to Mexico, where she devoted herself to studying. There she learned several languages that allowed her to perform as a translator of notable literary works. Later, she traveled to Guadalajara, Jalisco, where she composed most of her own works. It is known that she collaborated with the Mexico-based French writer Alfredo Bablot on the newspaper El Federalista. In 1864, before the French Intervention in Mexico, she moved to San Francisco, California. A year later, in 1865, she returned to Mexico and married her cousin Pedro Landázuri Diez, a notable politician of that era, and moved to the Tacubaya neighborhood in Mexico City.

Endowed with prodigious and very easy memory, she conceived and shaped her compositions without the help of the pen, and dictated them to her husband later. It can be said, in spite of the great extent of most of them, that they are all true improvisations.

She created a total of fourteen dramatic works, most notably Las dos flores, Los dos son peores, Oro y oropel, La escuela de las cuñadas, Duende y serafín, Abnegación, El Ángel del hogar, Una noche de Carnaval, Soñar despierto, and Un lirio entre zarzas.

In 1874, her husband assumed the position of consul of Mexico in Hamburg, so Isabel moved with him and their son Jorge (their daughter Blanca became ill and died in Veracruz while waiting for the ship that would take them to Hamburg; their third child was born in 1875, once they were already in Germany) to German territory.

She died in 1876 from a cerebral infarction.

José María Vigil read a speech entitled "La Sra. doña Isabel Prieto de Landázuri," a biographical and literary study of the author, before the Mexican Academy in 1882. Vigil himself compiled her poetic works in a publication by Ireneo Paz.
