= Elena Torres =

Mexican revolutionary, feminist, progressive educator and writer

Elena Torres Cuéllar
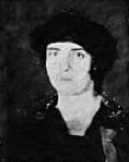
- Born: 3 June 1893; Mineral de Mellado, Guanajuato
- Died: 19 October 1970 (aged 77)
- Occupation: Educator
- Years active: 1912–1955

Elena Torres Cuéllar (3 June 1893 – 19 October 1970) was a leading Mexican revolutionary, feminist, progressive educator and writer. A member of the communist party, in 1917 she was the only woman to participate on behalf of the Liga Central de Resistencia at the first meeting of the Yucatán Socialist Party in Mérida. In 1919, she founded the Mexican Feminist Council campaigning for better social and economic conditions for women as well as the right to vote. She devoted considerable efforts to improving education in Mexico, especially by facilitating the training of primary school teachers in rural areas.

== Biography ==
Elena Torres Cuéllar was born 3 (or 23) June 1893 in Mineral de Mellado, Guanajuato, to Macedonio Torres and Francisca Cuéllar. She graduated from the public schools and attended night classes at the Guanajuato State Normal School, working at the mine hospital during the day. Studying accounting, typing and drawing, Torres graduated in 1912 and became principal of the Normal School. She also taught at the Silao Elementary School and the Casa del Obrero Mundial (The House of the World Worker), an anarchist-union organization which had branches throughout Mexico. Socialist schooling methods, based on "scientific" principals had been brought to Mexico at this time from Spain. Torres and the teachers she worked with became increasingly radicalized and favored the rational Spanish method over the Catholic parochial schools.

From 1909, she wrote articles opposing the Porfiriato regime, using the pen names of Una Guanajuatense and Violeta. In 1916, she attended the first National Feminist Congress in Mérida. She collaborated with the governor of Yucatán Salvador Alvarado who provided support for the second feminist congress in November 1916 at which a wide range of topics were discussed, including employment, education, suffrage, birth control and divorce. Impressed with Torres' performance, Alvarado encouraged her to found a Montessori school in Mérida, the state capital. It was the first such school in Mexico. In 1918, she associated with Trotsky's Third International, joining Felipe Carrillo Puerto in establishing Yucatán's Socialist Party in which she campaigned for women's rights. In 1919–20, together with María del Refugio García, she founded the Mexican Feminist Council (Consejo Feminista Mexicano) in Mexico City which supported social rights for women and their right to vote. In 1921, at the Second Workers' Congress in Izamal, Torres insisted women should be allowed to attend congresses and express their views.

Torres represented the Mexican Feminist Council at the 1922 League of Women Voters convention in Baltimore, where she also attended the Pan-American Conference of Women with a delegation of Mexican women. She was elected the association's vice-president for North America. In 1923, she went on to establish the Mexican chapter of the Pan-American Association for the Advancement of Women in Mexico City as well as Mexico's Women's Congress where she played a leading role in settling differences between conservative delegates and feminist radicals from Yucatán.

From 1921, Torres played an increasingly important role on the education front under the education minister José Vasconcelos. In state run schools, a free breakfast program was organized in that year, with Torres directing the services and even serving many of the meals. In the first year, they fed nearly 3,000 students daily and the following year the number had increased to 12,000 students per day. She fought for improved teacher training and became head of the Bureau of Cultural Missions which targeted improved conditions for primary school teachers, especially those working in rural areas. By 1926, six missions had been established covering over 2,000 rural teachers, expanding to 18 missions and more than 4,000 teachers over the next ten years.

In 1924, Torres was granted an international scholarship to study abroad and she completed her studies at Columbia University Teachers' College in New York City. While there she attended the 1925 Pan-American Women's Conference in Washington, DC and returned to Mexico in 1926. Originally, she was assigned back to the rural teaching mission project but on 17 May 1926 she was appointed chief professor of the Faculty of Letters at the Higher Normal School. She lost her post in 1927 due to her criticism of Mexican president Plutarco Elías Calles, moving back to the United States and taking a Spanish teaching job at the International School of Missouri. She returned briefly to Mexico in 1928 to campaign for José Vasconcelos's failed re-election bid, but when Pascual Ortiz Rubio won the presidency, she returned to the US.

Torres received an appointment from the Ministry of Public Education on 1 February 1932 and returned to the rural normal school program. In 1933, in an innovative program she gave home economics classes over the radio. The plan was to broadcast the educational programs throughout the country to all the farm village schools. In 1934, Torres was appointed to the Cuerpo Técnico de Educación Rural (Corps of Rural Education Technicians) to create a standard curriculum for teaching Home Economics. That same year, she traveled to a regional conference in Chile and in the fall made subsequent trips to Costa Rica, Ecuador, Panama, and Peru to talk about rural education in Mexico and visit their educational facilities. A similar trip was made in 1936 to Venezuela. She was appointed as the Professional Director of the Urban and Rural Primary Education Affairs Bureau in 1937. Her most important achievement at the bureau was a survey conducted in 1937 of the economic and social circumstances of the local residents of all 338 villages of Mexico. In 1942, Torres was appointed to the Elementary Education Inspectorate and worked as an inspector until 1955. During this time frame, she also served as an adviser to UNESCO.

Torres died on 19 October 1970.

== Autobiography ==
In 1964, Elena Torres published her autobiographical work Fragmentos.
