= Valentina Ramírez Avitia =

Mexican revolutionary (1893–1979)

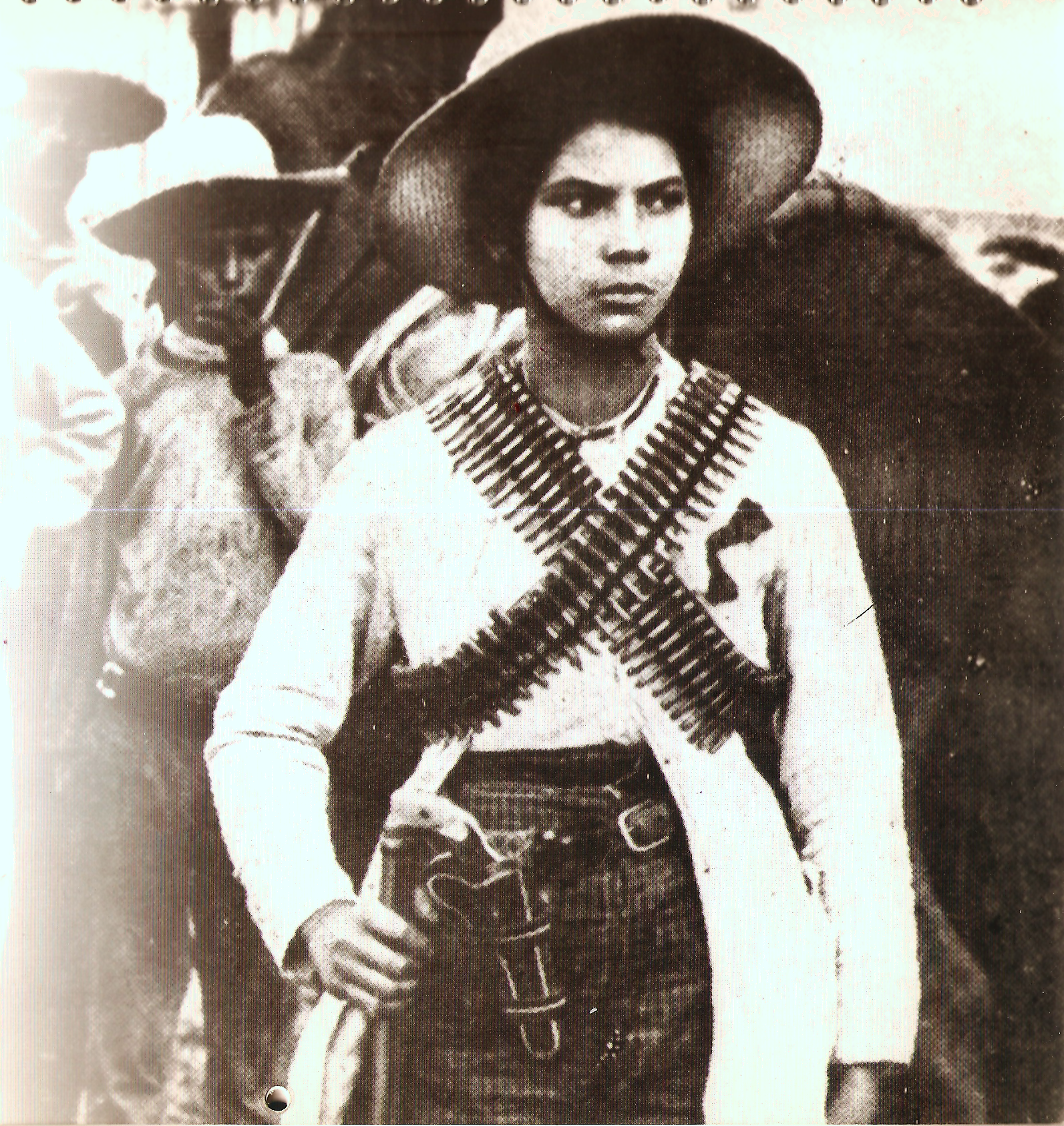
Ramírez Avitia c. 1913

Valentina Ramírez Avitia (14 February 1893 – 4 April 1979) was a Mexican revolutionary and soldadera. She was known as "La Valentina" and "La leona de Norotal". She fought against the Federales in the Mexican Revolution at a time when women were not allowed to join the army. Her parallels to the story of Hua Mulan lead to her modern nickname of "The Mexican Mulan" (Spanish: "La Mulán mexicana").

== Biography ==
Ramirez was born in Norotol, Durango, on 14 February 1893. Inspired by her father who was killed early in the Mexican Revolution, she decided to enlist. Wearing her brothers clothes, hiding her hair, and assuming the name of Juan Ramírez, Ramírez joined the Maderista Army under Francisco I. Madero in 1910. She quickly rose to the rank of lieutenant after a victorious battle in Culiacán. However, after participating in the conflict for only five months and ten days, it was discovered that Ramírez was a woman. On 22 June 1911 she was dismissed from the army.

== Later years ==
Upon her return home, Ramírez was shunned by her family and she lived in a slum in Sinaloa. She moved to Culiacán and lived there for over twenty years. In 1969, she was hit by a car in the city of Navolato. She was placed in a nursing home before she escaped. Crippled and without a wheelchair, she lived in a small scrap-metal hut and begged for food. On 4 April 1979, Ramírez died of burn wounds received after a fire in her hut.

== Legacy ==
The corrido "La Valentina" was composed as a tribute to Avitia. The film La Valentina and the 1966 remake were later inspired by the corrido.

Valentina brand hot sauce is named in her honor.

== See also ==
- Amelio Robles Ávila
- Petra Herrera
- Ángela Jiménez
- María Quinteras de Meras
