= La Adelita =

Ballad from the Mexican Revolution

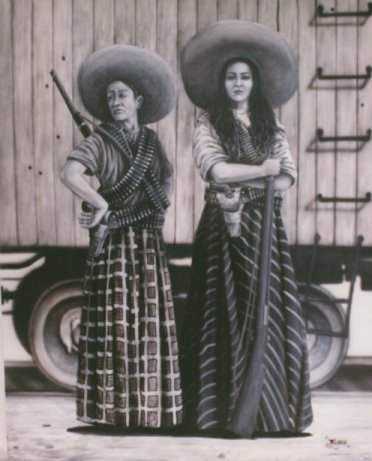
Depiction of "adelitas", or soldaderas, of the Mexican Revolution.

"La Adelita" is one of the most famous corridos of the Mexican Revolution. Over the years, it has had many adaptations. The ballad was inspired by Adela Velarde Pérez, a Chihuahuense woman who joined the Maderista movement in the early stages of the revolution and fell in love with Madero. She became a popular icon and a symbol of the role of women in the Mexican Revolution. The figure of the adelita gradually became synonymous with the term soldadera, the woman in a military-support (and sometimes fighting) role, who became a vital force in the revolutionary efforts through provisioning, espionage, and other activities in the battles against Mexican federal government forces.

However, the song, the portrait, and the role of its subject have been given different, often conflicting, interpretations. It has also been argued that "'La Adelita' expressed the sensitivity and vulnerability of men, emphasizing the stoicism of the rebellious male soldier as he confronts the prospect of death". In another interpretation, the feminist scholar María Herrara-Sobek argues, "Adelita's bravery and revolutionary spirit are lost to the fatalism and insecurities of male soldiers who are focused on passions, love, and desire as they face combat".

== Why women joined the Mexican Revolution ==
The song "La Adelita" depicts the brave women who fought and traveled with the Federales and the revolutionary army. The song speaks of Adelita as someone who is pretty and the object of desire for many of the soldiers, but who also has bravery and commands respect. However, this was not the case. La Adelita is based on real-life camp followers and soldaderas that bravely fought and traveled side by side with soldiers. These women ranged from young girls to middle-aged women and were from all over the country, including, but not limited to, Oaxaca, Morelos, Tehuantepec, Central Mexico, and Sonora. According to some observers, these women were also often of mestiza or indigenous origin. There were many reasons these women joined the Mexican Revolution. Some joined because of the poor economic situation in Mexico at the time. Unable to find other jobs, women joined to take care of the soldiers. Women were also forced to join the military when Mexican President Victoriano Huerta increased the quota for his standing army, which included forcing women to go to the front and work as cooks. Additionally, many women were coerced to go with their husbands once they were either drafted or chose to join. And some women decided to follow their husbands as loyal wives. Finally, some women were left with no choice, like Angela Jimenez, who at the age of fifteen had Federales search her home for rebels and try to force themselves on her sister, resulting in her death. Enraged by this experience, Jimenez started to dress as a boy and go by the name "Angel" to join her father on the rebel front lines.

== The role of soldaderas ==
Women played multiple different roles while serving in the military and working in military camps. One of the primary roles of women in the Mexican Revolution was the making and cooking of tortillas. Specifically, Zapatistas relied heavily on the relationship between the military and villages to get food. This relationship required the willingness and commitment of women in the villages to make these tortillas for the soldiers all day and allow them to collect them later. Without this relationship, it is possible that soldiers would have died of starvation as there was no food network set up to feed these men. However, this relationship was not the only one between Zapatistas and women. Due to not having any camp followers, Zapatistas would kidnap and rape women from the same villages where they got their food. Other military factions, like the Orozquistas, had camp followers to make food for the soldiers instead of the village system. In addition to cooking food for the male soldiers, women in military camps also acted as spies, medical attendants, nurses, messengers, and smugglers. Specifically, soldaderas would spy in enemy camps, steal documents, and smuggle United States arms over the border into Mexico.

== The difference between a soldadera and a female soldier ==
Despite common belief, the terms soldaderas and female soldiers are not necessarily interchangeable. The term soldaderas usually applies to the women who provided for the soldiers. Soldaderas are the ones who made food and acted as nurses. Female soldiers differed from soldaderas, but that does not discount all the valuable work soldaderas did for the Mexican Revolution. Female soldiers and soldaderas usually came from different backgrounds. Female soldiers in the Mexican Revolution usually had higher social standings, while soldaderas were generally from poor, indigenous backgrounds. Female soldiers also had different roles. Female soldiers fought alongside the male soldiers and were sent to infiltrate the soldaderas of Federales camps, befriending them and then stealing critical documents. Although it occasionally happened, it was rare for a soldadera to become a female soldier.

== The different depictions of la Adelita ==
La Adelita has been portrayed in various ways since the Mexican Revolution. In corridos, she was often reduced to stereotypes such as the caretaker or the lover, whereas real soldaderas often demonstrated courage, resilience, and traditionally masculine strength. Male writers and observers often reshaped the image of la Adelita into one that fit the era's idealized woman: obedient yet sexualized . An example of this is Angel Martin's depiction of la Adelita, where he depicts her wearing a revealing top with a belt of bullets strapped around her.

In other forms of art, such as dance, la Adelita is represented for who she was: brave and heroic. The folkloric dance "las Adelitas" is only performed by women, and is extremely popular in Chicano festivals.

== Women after the war ==
After the Mexican Revolution, different things happened to the women who worked in the war. Many soldaderas returned to their hometowns and everyday lives with their husbands if they were still alive. While others, such as Amelio (Amelia) Robles, continued living as a man after the war was over. Others moved to Mexico City, such as Garcia Magallanes and Palancares, to continue a life of adventure. Some female soldiers got government veterans' pensions after the war. However, many could not get pensions, despite many petitions to the Mexican government. When Garcia Magallanes attempted to get a pension for her duties in the military, she was mocked. Because of the strict gender roles and values deeply embedded in Mexican society, some of these female fighters were not accepted back into their hometowns. People were uncomfortable with the fact that women had fought in the war and did not want to acknowledge that that had happened. Some women who did not feel welcome in Mexico any longer immigrated to California (United States). Women like Villasana Lopez and Angela Jimenez left Mexico before the revolution was even over in an attempt to escape the violence of the end of the revolution. So many women immigrated that Angela Jimenez was able to form La Organizacion de Veteranos de la Revolución de 1910–1920.

== Lyrics ==
The song "La Adelita" contributed to the notion that soldaderas were only romantic figures during the revolution.

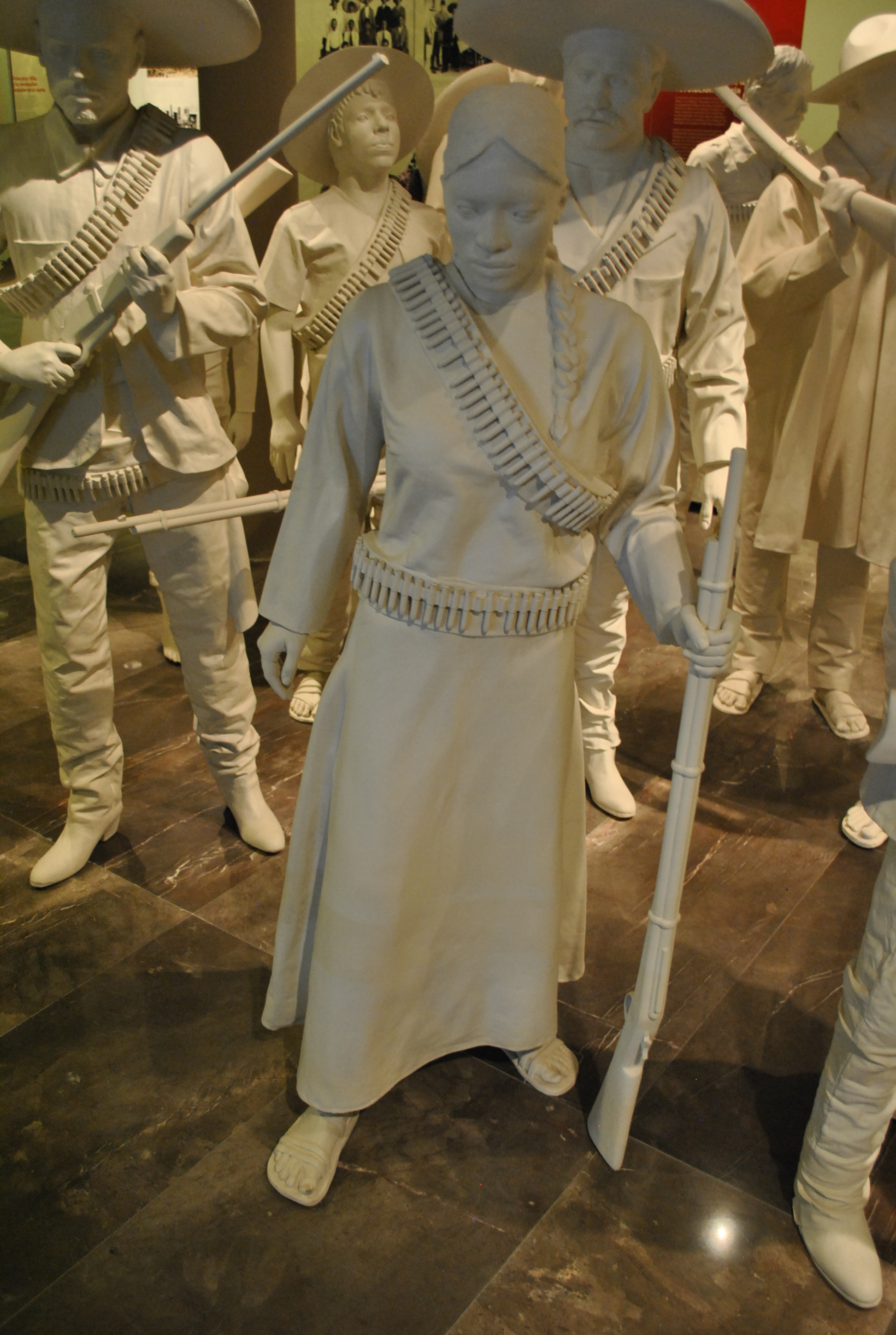
Adelita in the Historical Museum of the Mexican Revolution.

Spanish:

En lo alto de la abrupta serranía

acampado se encontraba un regimiento

y una moza que valiente los seguía

locamente enamorada del sargento.

English:

On the heights of a steep mountain range

a regiment was encamped,

and a young woman bravely follows them,

madly in love with the sergeant.

Popular entre la tropa era Adelita

la mujer que el sargento idolatraba

que además de ser valiente era bonita

que hasta el mismo coronel la respetaba.

Popular among the troop was Adelita,

the woman that the sergeant idolized,

and besides being brave she was pretty,

so that even the colonel respected her.

Y se oía, que decía, aquel que tanto la quería:

Y si Adelita se fuera con otro

la seguiría por tierra y por mar

si por mar en un buque de guerra

si por tierra en un tren militar.

And it was heard that the one who loved her so much said:

If Adelita were to leave with another man,

I’d follow her by land and sea

if by sea, in a warship;

if by land, in a military train.

Y si Adelita quisiera ser mi esposa

y si Adelita ya fuera mi mujer

le compraría un vestido de seda

para llevarla a bailar al cuartel.

If Adelita would like to be my wife,

if Adelita would be my woman,

I’d buy her a silk dress

to take her to the barracks dance.

== See also ==
- Corrido, a type of narrative song found in Mexican folk music
- Soldaderas, female support workers and sometimes soldiers who served in the Mexican Revolution
- José Guadalupe Posada
