= Adela Velarde Pérez =

Mexican activist (1900–1971)

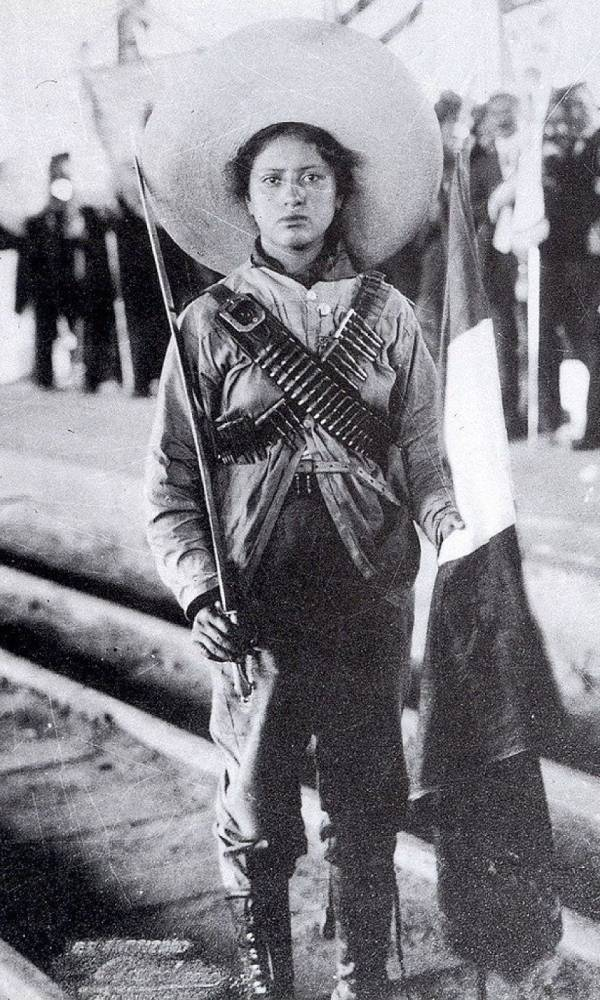
- Born: 8 September 1900; Ciudad Juárez, Chihuahua, Mexico
- Died: 4 September 1971 (aged 70); United States
- Occupation: Activist

Adela Velarde Pérez (8 September 1900 – 4 September 1971) was a Mexican activist who fought in the Mexican Revolution.

== Biography ==
The daughter of a wealthy inhabitant of Ciudad Juárez, she realised at a young age that her calling was medicine. In 1915, she joined the Mexican Association of the White Cross. She was the creator of the revolutionary group of the Soldaderas, women who healed soldiers wounded in combat, with some of these even taking up arms and fighting.

Even so, Adela Velarde, the "Adelita", was not recognized for her value in combat and after the Mexican Revolution, she was forgotten. It was only in 1962 that she was finally recognized as a veteran of the Revolution and for her opposition to the government of Victoriano Huerta. She died in abject poverty in the United States, in 1971.

== Legacy ==
Adela Velarde Pérez is now recognized as the woman whose name represents all the nurses that provided their services not only to care for the sick and wounded during the Mexican Revolution, but also to carry weapons, take care of food and even participate in battles if required.

She is the inspiration for "La Adelita".
