= Esperanza Zambrano =

Mexican poet (1901–1992)

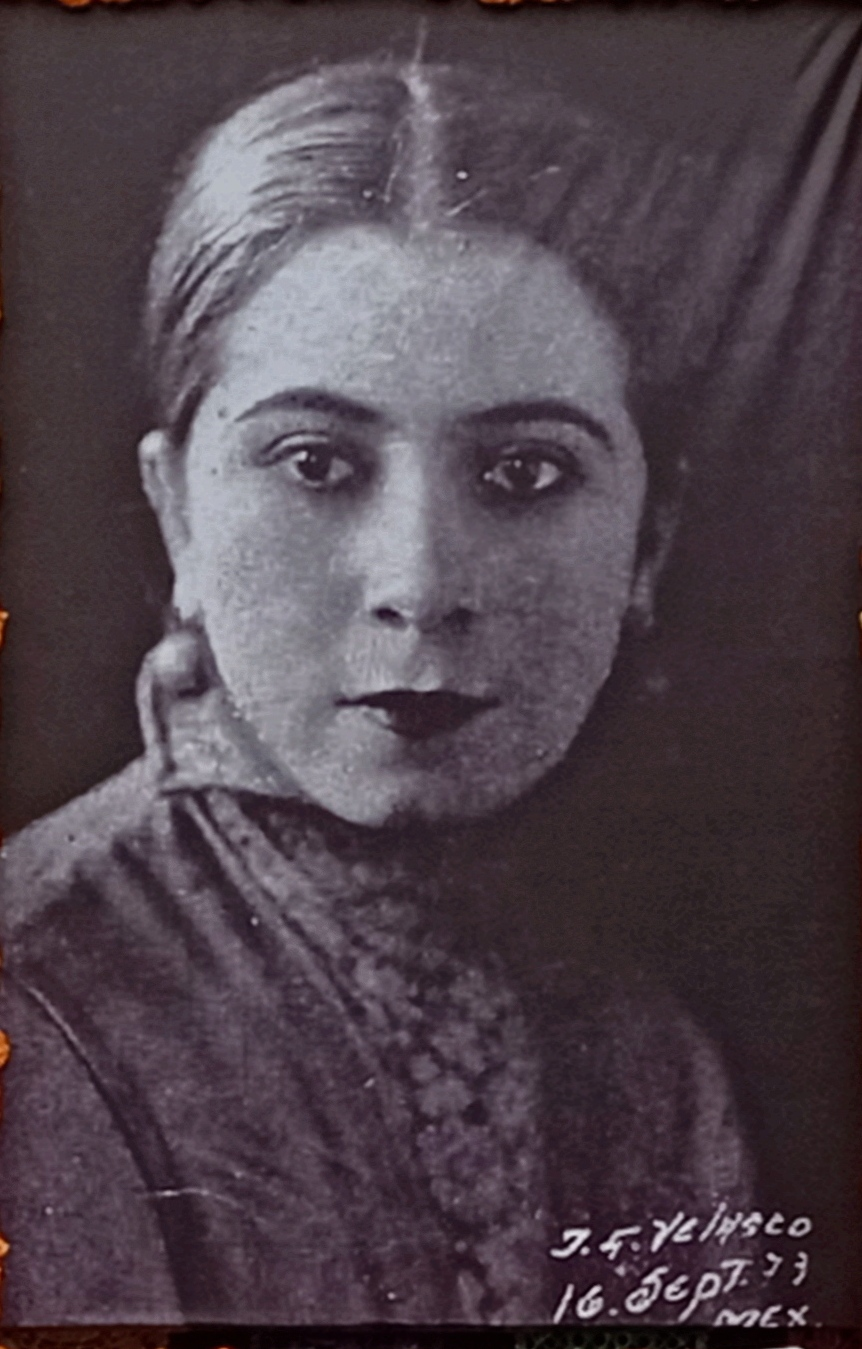
- Born: María Esperanza Dolores Zambrano Sánchez; November 14, 1901; Dolores Hidalgo, Guanajuato, Mexico
- Died: June 4, 1992 (aged 90); Mexico City, Mexico
- Resting place: Panteón Español, Mexico City
- Education: National Autonomous University of Mexico
- Occupation: Spanish
- Spouse: Miguel Wimer
- Children: Javier Wimer Zambrano
- Parent(s): Agustín José Zambrano & María Ana Sánchez
- Writing career
- Language: poet; writer
- Notable awards: Ordre des Palmes académiques
- Literary movement: Modernismo

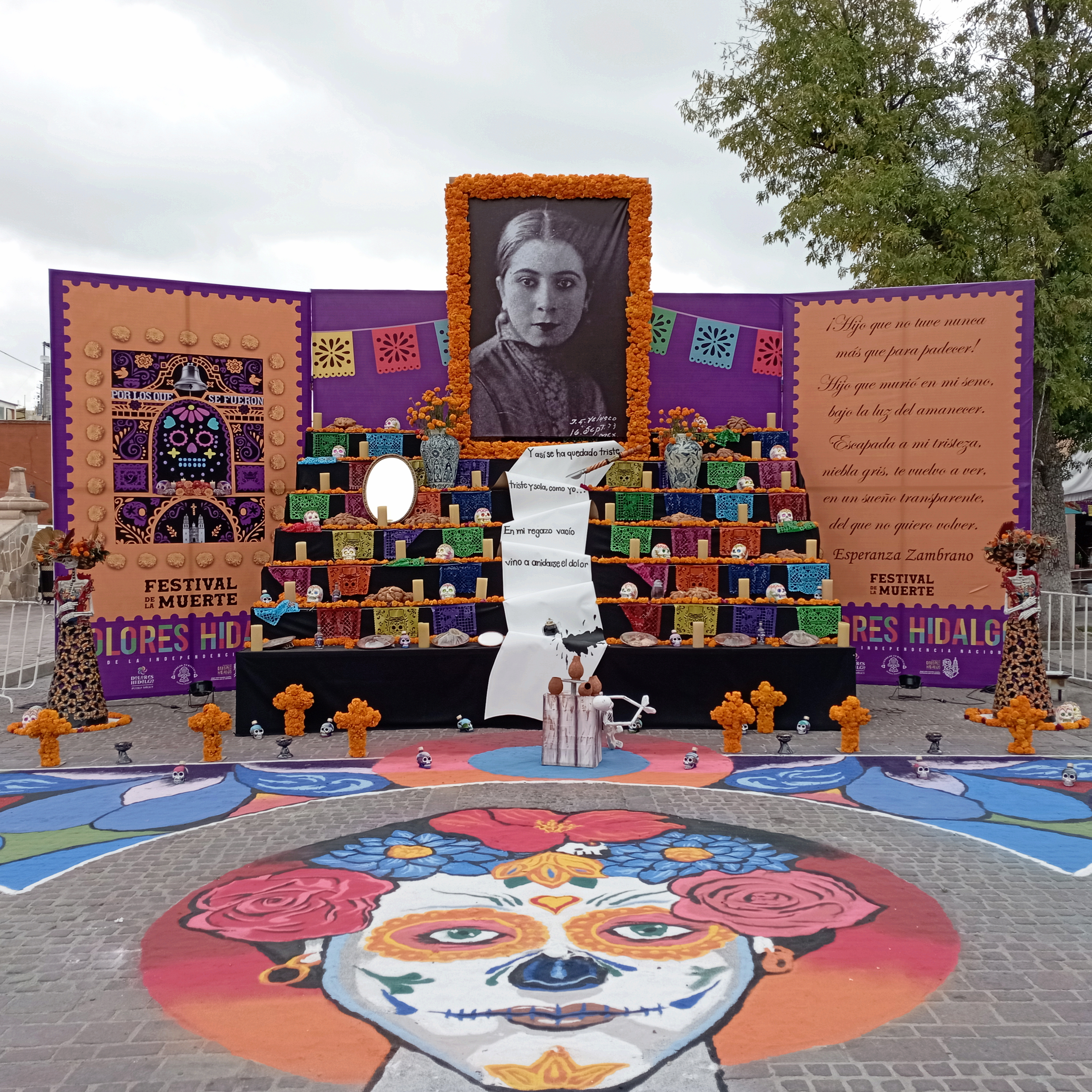
Altar in honor of Esperanza Zambrano. (Day of the Dead Eve 2022; Dolores Hidalgo, Guanajuato, Mexico)

María Esperanza Dolores Zambrano Sánchez (November 14, 1901 – June 4, 1992) was a Mexican poet. She was affiliated with several organizations including the Pan American Union, publications of the Inter-American Commission of Women of the Organization of American States, the Mexican Legion of Honor, as well as being the co-founder and president of the Ateneo Mexicano de Mujeres. Zambrano was the laureate of awards from Mexico, France, and the Dominican Republic.

== Biography ==
María Esperanza Dolores Zambrano Sánchez was born on November 14, 1901, in Dolores Hidalgo, Guanajuato, Mexico. the author of a short poetic work, which she released in limited editions. All of her work was characterized by the use of resources of Modernismo origin, such as Alexandrine verse, the search for sonority, decadent sensuality, and experimentation in stanza forms. Furthermore, her way of using adjectives is reminiscent of Ramón López Velarde's style. La inquietud joyante, her first book, was a surprise in the Mexican poetry scene, as never before had a woman referred directly to her intimacy and her amorous desires. This line is continued by her next book, Los ritmos de los secretos, although her feeling of intimacy is further accentuated. In Canciones del amor perfecto her lyrics become an exaltation of married love and the happiness that motherhood causes. With Retablos del Viejo Guanajuato, she is interested in popular and regional poetry, while Fuga de estío marks her return to intimate poetry, although with a tone of serenity and resignation in the face of old age and heartbreak.

She was an adviser and director of the Pan American Union and of publications of the Inter-American Commission of Women of the Organization of American States. She was a member of the Mexican Legion of Honor; as well as the co-founder and president of the Ateneo Mexicano de Mujeres. She obtained the Ordre des Palmes académiques award (1945) and the Medalla de Reconocimiento (1946), in France; the Juan Pablo Duarte Award from the Dominican Republic; and the Medal of Merit from the Government of Guanajuato (1963).

Zambrano died in Mexico City on June 4, 1992.

== Selected works ==
- La inquietud joyante
- Los ritmos de los secretos
- Canciones del amor perfecto
- Retablos del Viejo Guanajuato
- Fuga de estío
