= Legion of Honor (disambiguation) =

The Legion of Honour is the highest decoration awarded by France.

Legion of Honor may also refer to:

- Philippine Legion of Honor, one of the highest decorations awarded by the Philippines
- Palais de la Légion d'Honneur, a building in Paris constructed as a tribute to the members of the Legion of Honour
- American Legion of Honor, a U.S. fraternal benefit society active from 1878 to 1904
- Mexican Legion of Honor, an order of merit awarded to soldiers and veterans
- Legion of Honor, formally known as the California Palace of the Legion of Honor, a museum in San Francisco; the building is based on the Palais de la Légion d'Honneur
- Sigma Nu fraternity, a men's college social fraternity who style themselves as such, and whose official initiate badge is modeled after the above French award
- Legion of Honor may refer to a vanity award sold by the American Biographical Institute
