= Meras (disambiguation) =

Méras is a commune in the Ariège department, France.

Meras may also refer to:

- Icchokas Meras, Lithuanian Jewish writer
- María Quinteras de Meras, soldadera (woman soldier) in the rank of colonel in the army of Pancho Villa during the Mexican Revolution
- Norma Meras Swenson
- Umut Meraş, Turkish footballer
- Mera people
- Meras River, Sweden

== See also ==
- Mera (disambiguation)
