= Long Meg =

Long Meg may refer to:

- Long Meg of Westminster, 16th-century innkeeper
- Long Meg and Her Daughters, stone circle
