= Ángela Jiménez =

Soldadera of Mexican Revolution

- Born: Ángela Jiménez; January 6, 1886; Santa María Jalapa del Marqués, Oaxaca, Mexico
- Died: 1990
- Other name: Ángel

Ángela Jiménez, alias Lieutenant Ángel (January 6, 1886–1990) was a soldadera (woman fighter) during the Mexican Revolution. She performed different duties such as a flag bearer, spy and sometimes cook. She was also an expert in explosives.

Jiménez left the state of Oaxaca and fought in the center and north of the country with the Villaistas and Zapatistas.

== Biography ==
=== Early life ===
Jiménez was the daughter of a Zapotec mother and a Spaniard. Her father was the Political Chief of the Isthmus of Tehuantepec under the Porfirian regime. Growing up, she lived in a Spanish style hacienda surrounded by a barrier of trees and running brooks. She would often skip school to play in the countryside while her father's workers searched for her

In 1910, when the Mexican revolution first began, her father tried to pacify the Zapotec by reading Madero's Manifiesto a la Nación and reassuring them that Diaz would resign. When that didn't happen, small groups began to form and they named her father as their leader. In 1911, federal soldiers sent by Diaz searched her home for rebels. While Jiménez, her mother, and her sister Blanca were hiding in their basement, the captain approached Blanca and attempted to rape her. Blanca pulled the gun from the captain's belt and shot him three times before shooting herself. After witnessing this, Jiménez swore to kill federals. She dressed as a man and called herself Ángel.

=== Military career ===
She joined the Mexican Revolution along with her father and reached the position of lieutenant even though her colleagues knew she was a woman.

In 1916, General Jacinto Trevino captured Jiménez, her father, and other soldiers and took them to Chihuahua to have them executed. Her father, upset that they were going to die, gave Jiménez his belt filled with gold coins and centeranios. Jiménez bought food from a peddler that was allowed to enter the prison, and after slipping her a gold coin, she brought Jiménez women's clothing that she used to escape from prison. While free, she stayed with the peddler, Maria, and her children and eventually met a railroad worker for the Carranzistas.

With a gunshot wound, she left the army and emigrated to Texas and then California, where she was one of the founders of the organization "Veterans of the Revolution" in California (1910 – 1990). She was also a defender of Chicano Rights in the United States.

It is believed that her revolutionary life was the model used by Elena Poniatowska to draw the character of Jesusa Palancares in "Hasta no verte Jesús mío".

Ángela Jiménez died in 1990.

== See also ==
- Petra Herrera
- Amelio Robles Ávila
