= Camp follower =

Civilians who follow armies

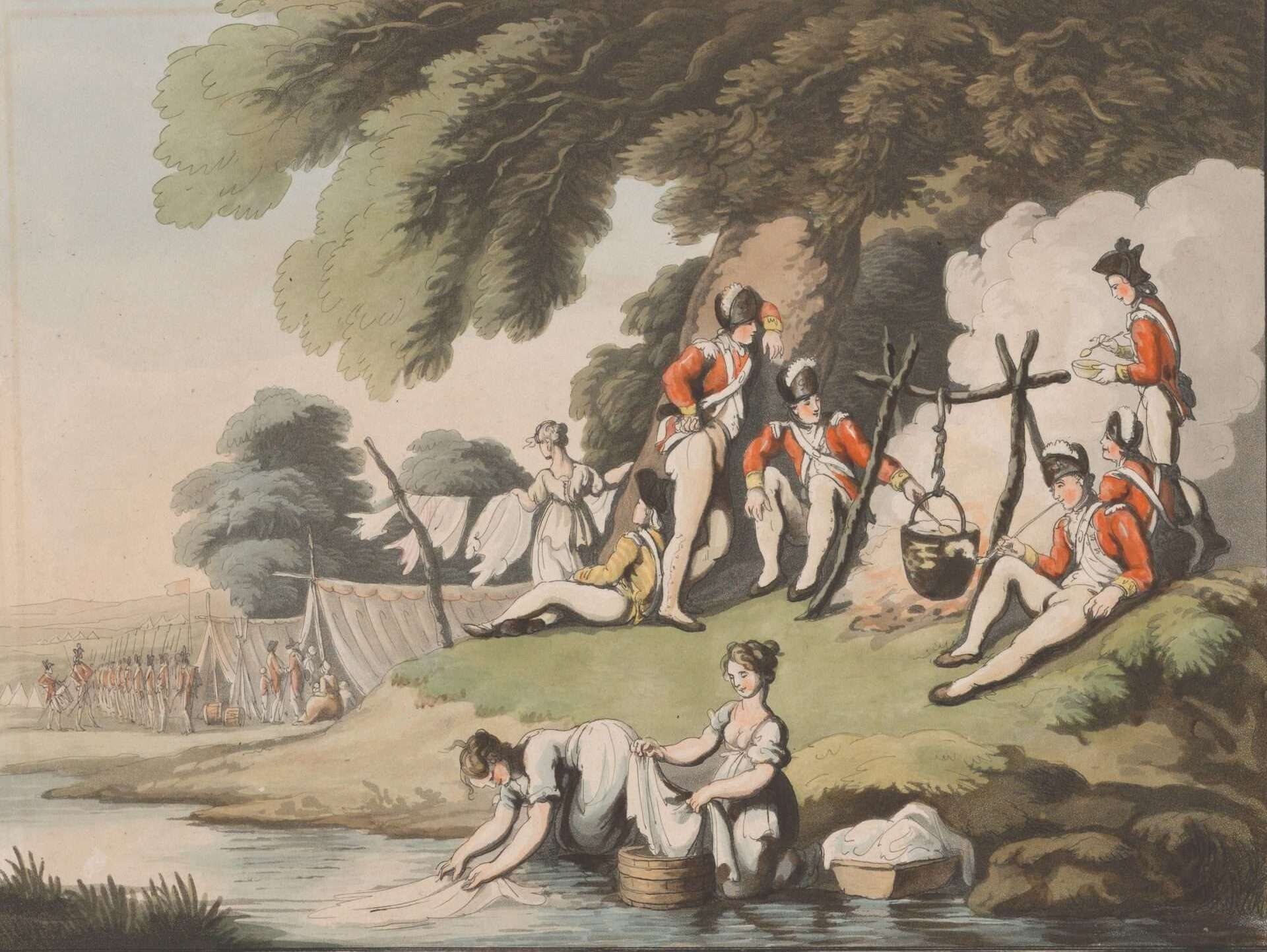
1798 engraving showing female camp followers at a British military camp

Camp followers are civilians who follow armies. There are two common types of camp followers; first, the spouses and children of soldiers, who follow their spouse or parent's army from place to place; the second type of camp followers have historically been informal army service providers, servicing the needs of encamped soldiers, in particular selling goods or services that the military does not supply—these have included cooking, laundering, liquor, nursing, and sutlery.

== History ==
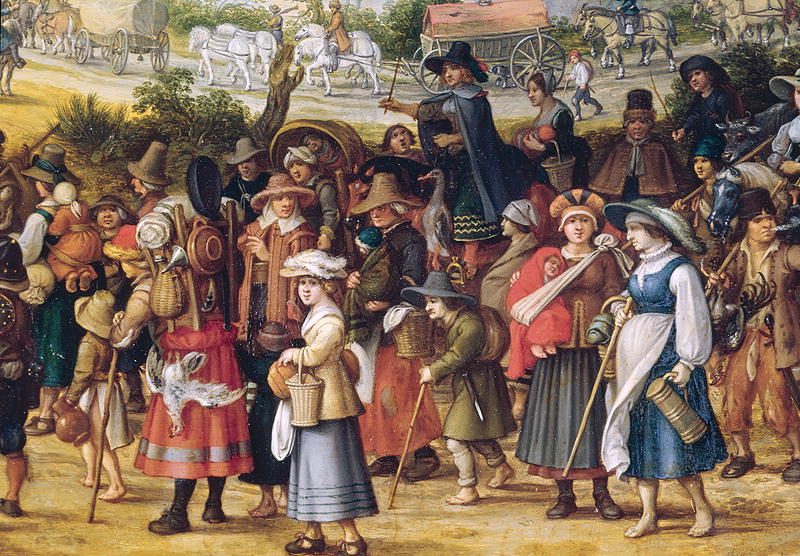
Painting of camp followers during the Thirty Years' War

From the beginning of organized warfare until the end of the 19th century, European and American armies heavily depended on the services of camp followers. These services included delivery and preparation of provisions and transportation of supplies, which augmented the official military support structure. It included civilian merchants, contractors and teamsters, as well as family members such as wives, attached to the troops. Camp followers usually accompanied the baggage train and they often outnumbered the army itself, adding to its logistical problems. Camp followers were both a support and drain on an army as they provided valuable services but also increased difficulties in logistics and security. Soldiers' wives washed, sewed, nursed and even acted as servants. However, camp followers needed to be fed, clothed, transported and guarded. They also had to be policed; camp followers could be among the most determined scavengers and looters after battles and whilst on the march.

From the middle of the 19th century on, the creation of organized and resourced transport, medical, ordnance and supply corps as an integral part of regular armies marked the end of reliance on camp followers in most European armies. However, in much of the world the concept of numerous civilian workers, family members and hangers-on accompanying armies survived into the 20th century, either for reasons of local culture or in the absence of formal support services. A notable example was the Mexican Revolution of 1910–1920, where female soldaderas filling traditional camp roles, carrying equipment and often acting as combatants were a marked feature of Zapatista, Villista, and federal forces at all times.

=== United States ===
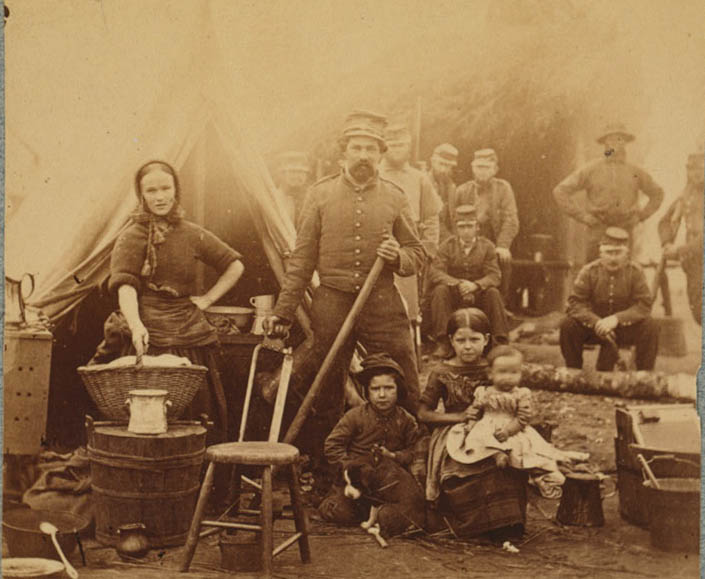
Camp follower (left) in 1862 during the American Civil War

In the military history of the United States camp followers were important in servicing and supplying the army during the Revolutionary War. There were also camp followers on both the Union and Confederate sides of the Civil War. However, a major difference between the armies of the American Revolution and the Civil War was the presence of women and children. By the time of the Civil War, camps and campaigns included far fewer wives, children and other relatives of soldiers. Women still served as nurses in hospitals and in other limited support roles, but were not present in the same way as in the earlier war.

During the 19th century, members of Plains Indians who set up camp outside US military forts or Indian agencies became known disparagingly as "loafers", or "loaf-around-the-fort Indians" or "hang-around-the-fort Indians". They along with the Indian scouts were seen by settlers as appeasing and docile, in stark contrast with the fierce and capable warriors whom the soldiers had to fight.

Modern military operations in combat zones, such as the Iraq War that began with US invasion in 2003 or the Afghan War that began in 2001, feature extensive roles played by civilian contractors in providing logistic support for the armed forces. This has led journalists and historians to liken the phenomenon to that of camp followers.

== Contemporary usage ==
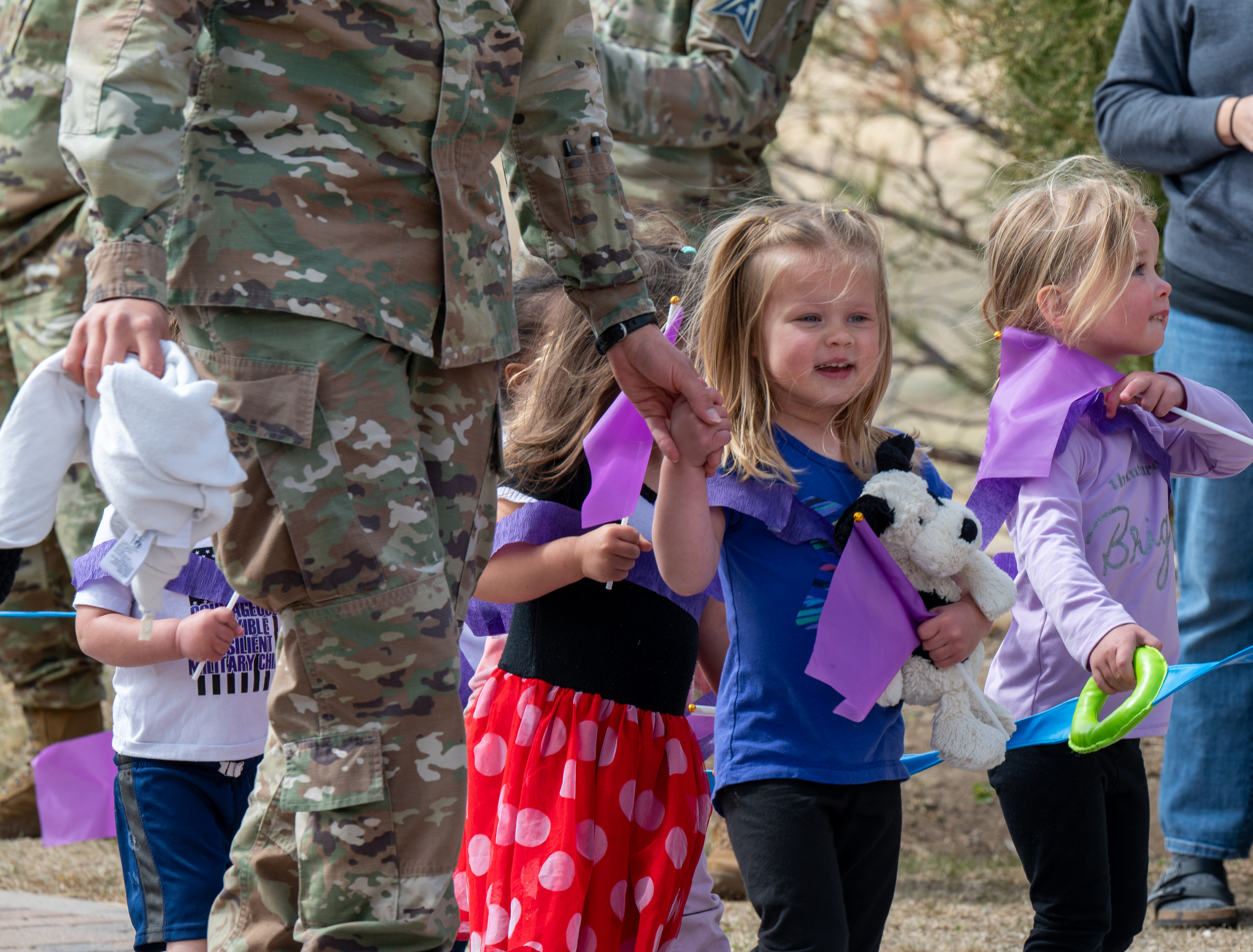
American military brats in 2024. Child camp followers are often referred to as "military brats".

"Camp-follower" has also been used to describe the modern families of military personnel who accompany soldiers while traveling; either during active military campaigns (more common in less-developed countries), or during peacetime military deployments (more common in developed countries), especially moving from military base to military base in a nomadic lifestyle (more common in developed countries).

Modern camp-follower children are now more often called military brats in several English-speaking countries. In the United Kingdom, the United States, and Canada, the term refers specifically to the mobile children of career soldiers, who traditionally have been camp or base followers. In the United States this practice of base-following, or camp-following, dates all the way back to the beginning of the republic.

Some work has also been done to document and describe military brat subcultures from other English speaking countries as well.

== Artistic depictions ==
Mother Courage and Her Children, the 1939 play by Bertolt Brecht, focuses on the life of a family of camp followers during the Thirty Years' War (1618–1648).

== Examples ==
- Tross – medieval German camp followers
- Vivandière – an account of sutlers and canteen-keepers
- Soldaderas
- Sutler

== Notables ==
- Long Meg of Westminster
