= Francisco Villa Museum =

Museum focused on Mexican revolutionary "Pancho" Villa

Coordinates: 28.6267°N 106.0685°W

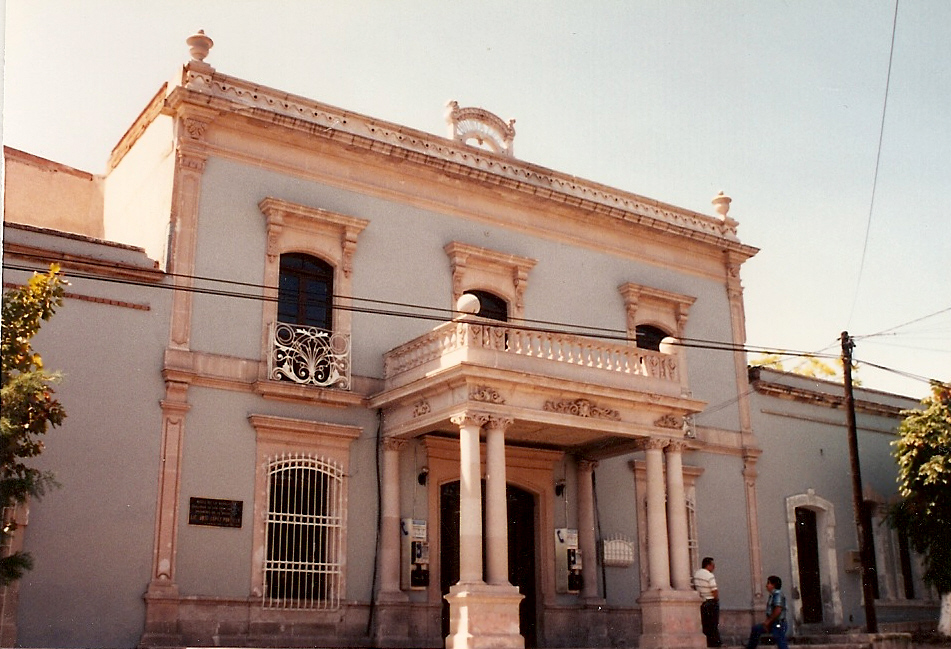
The house once known as the Quinta Luz, but now the Francisco Villa Museum in Chihuahua, Mexico, comprises the estate of General Francisco Villa.

The Francisco Villa Museum (also, the Historical Museum of the Mexican Revolution) is dedicated to the life and times of the Mexican Revolutionary, Francisco "Pancho" Villa. The museum is in Chihuahua, Chihuahua, Mexico, and is housed in the former estate of General Francisco Villa and his widow, María Luz Corral de Villa.

== The property ==
The Villa Museum and its extensive collection of memorabilia of Villa's life, as well as souvenirs and documents relating to other revolutionary leaders, was turned over to the Mexican government in 1981 upon the death of Mrs. Villa. One may view the saddles of the 'Centaur of the North', as Villa was styled. These common saddles are known as the McClellan saddle, developed by General George Brinton. It was a reliable saddle and could fit any size horse. Also exhibited are his pistols in the armory, along with his bedroom, living quarters, and photographic memorabilia relating to his activities during the Mexican Revolution. The centerpiece of the collection in the courtyard is the bullet-ridden Dodge automobile in which he and his bodyguards were assassinated in 1923 in the city of Hidalgo del Parral in southern Chihuahua. He is reportedly buried in the Monumento a la Revolución in Mexico City.

== History ==
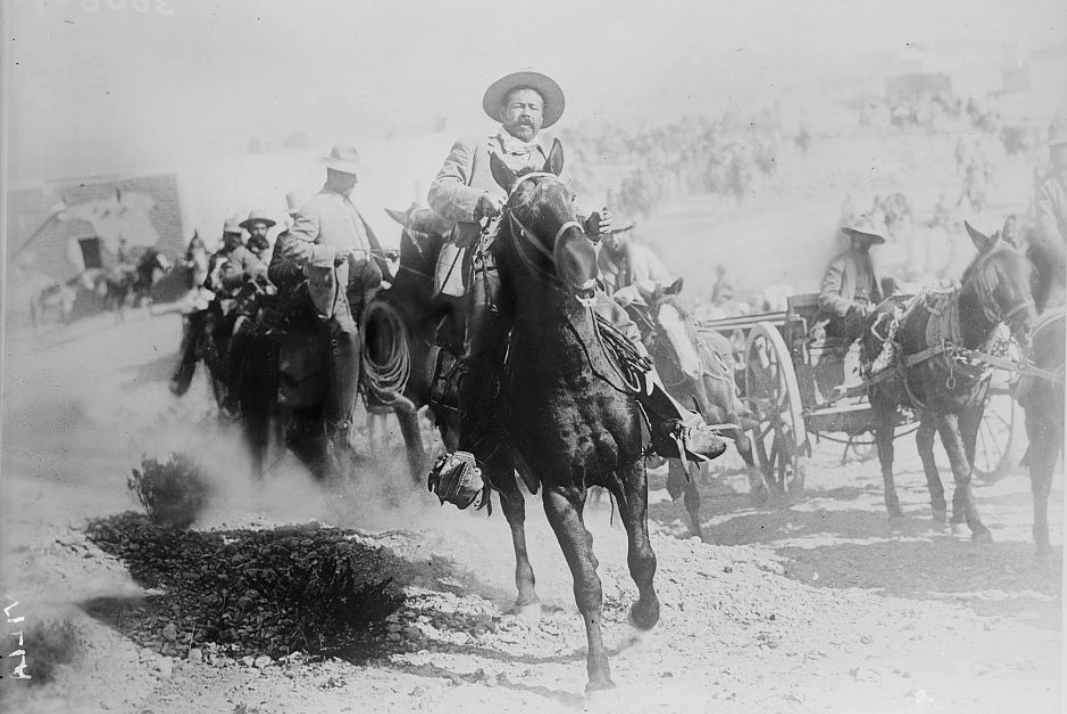
General Villa leading his guerillas and a common portrait found in the museum in Chihuahua, Mexico

The house was constructed between 1905 and 1907. It is in Chihuahua, Mexico, at 3010, Colonia Santa Rosa. By 1911 the house could no longer fulfill his needs. When Villa was governor of Chihuahua in early 1914, he began to remodel and enlarge the area making it a residence known as "Quinta Luz", in honor of his wife, Señora doña Luz Corral.

The works of the remodeled house was made possible by Santo Vega, Hilario Berumen, Manuel Portillio, and Italian painter Mario Ferrer. It was remodeled into three sections: the main house where Villa stayed, the back house, and the courtyard.

By 1915 the house became abandoned because the family took refuge in the United States. After five years, Villa's wife returned, reportedly because she missed her homeland, and Villa followed. He died in 1923 when he and his Centaurio del Norte bodyguards were assassinated in Parral.

Near the end of her life, Villa's wife received visitors from bed, too weak to rise. In early 1981, Luz Corral, who was ill and too advanced in age to maintain the house, stipulated that when she died the house would be donated to the city, provided they turn it into a museum in honor of Villa. The Ministry of Defense accepted the offer. Mrs Villa died at age 89 on July 6, 1981.

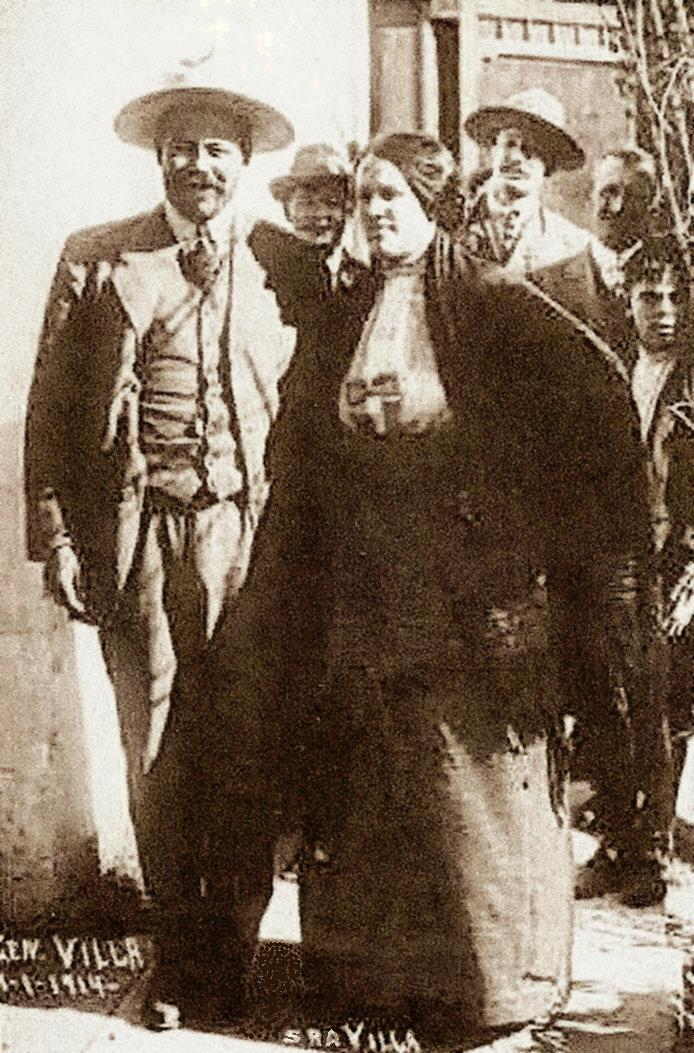
Gen. Francisco Villa and Luz Corral, 1914.

Because of the poor state in which it was received, many restorations had to be made by the National Institute of Anthropology and History. The house re-opened on November 17, 1982. The office and music room were used to display the personal belongings of Villa. There are photographs and other personal belongings of Villa's era. One exhibit is the car he was traveling in with his escort on the day he was assassinated. The curator of the museum is Adolfo Carrasco Vargas.

== Exhibits ==
On the first floor of the museum are utensils and furniture that were commonly used by the Villa Corral family.

On the second floor are five showrooms. The Hall of Arms is where the weapons Villa used in many of his combat missions are displayed. Some of the weapons on exhibit include revolvers, rifles, machine guns, cavalry sabers, baskets, and leather cases with brass. There is a photograph of Rafael Mendoza, a native of Maderas, Chihuahua, who during the Mexican Revolution invented the first air-cooled machine gun, capable of firing 250 rounds per minute. In another showcase, known as the Tragic Room, museum visitors are able to witness the death of General Villa. There is a display that shows the map of the route Villa took before his assassination, and his death mask, taken three hours after his death. On display throughout the house are numerous photographs.

== Gallery ==
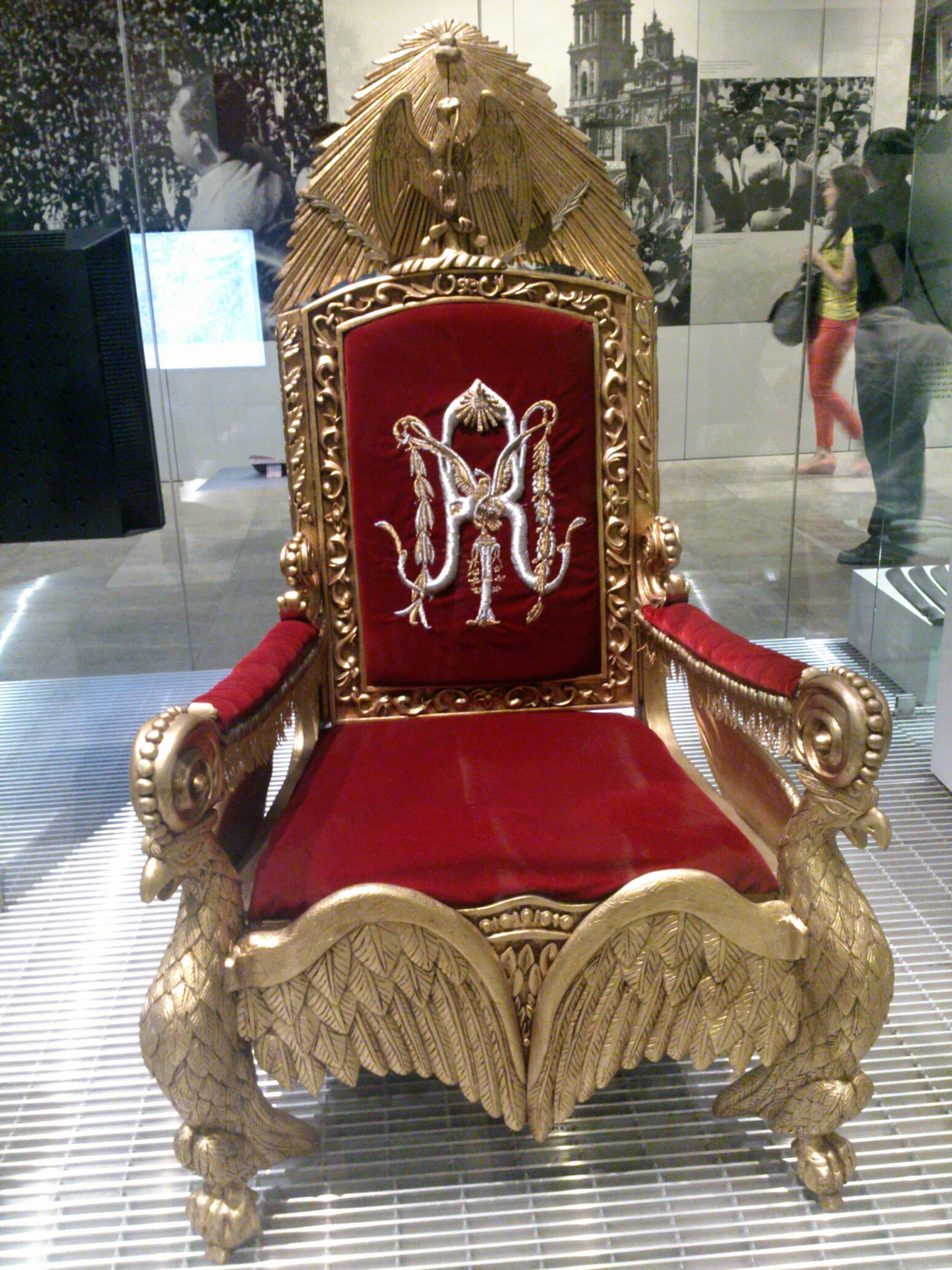
Reproduction of the first presidential chair.

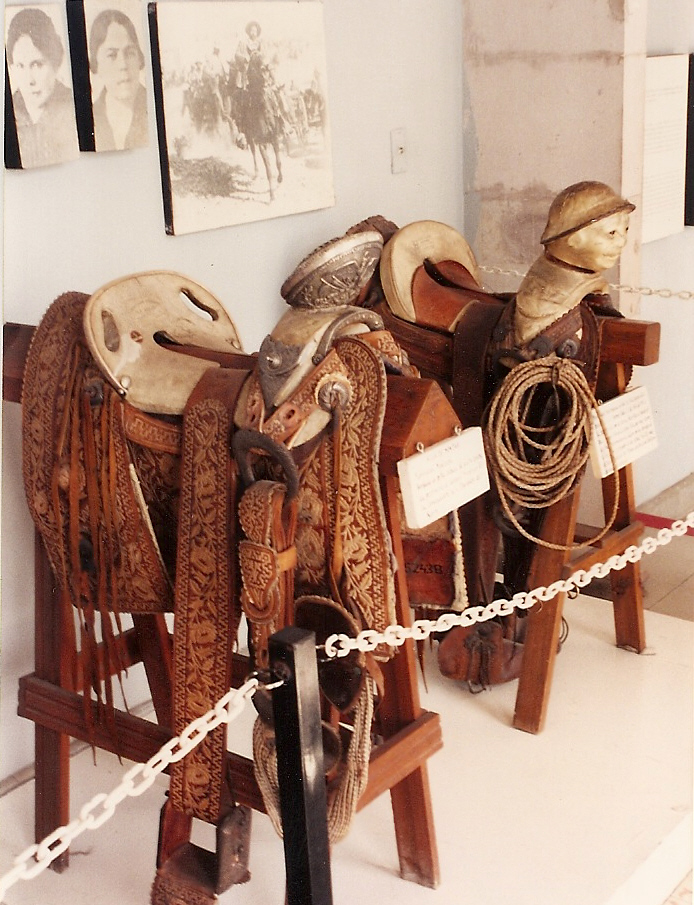
The common saddles that were used by Villa and his men.

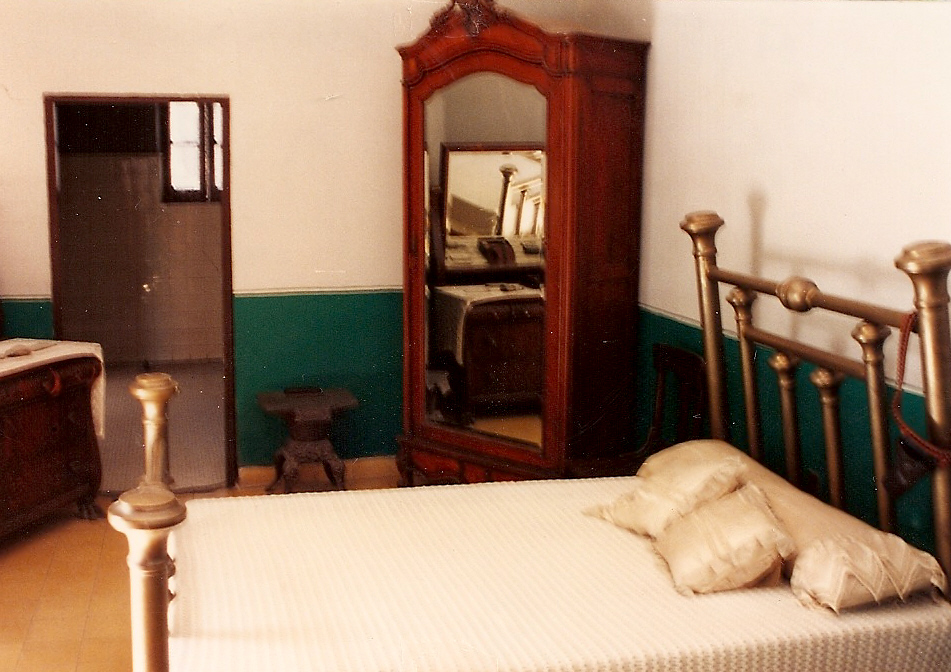
Villa's bedroom. Note pistol hanging from headboard.

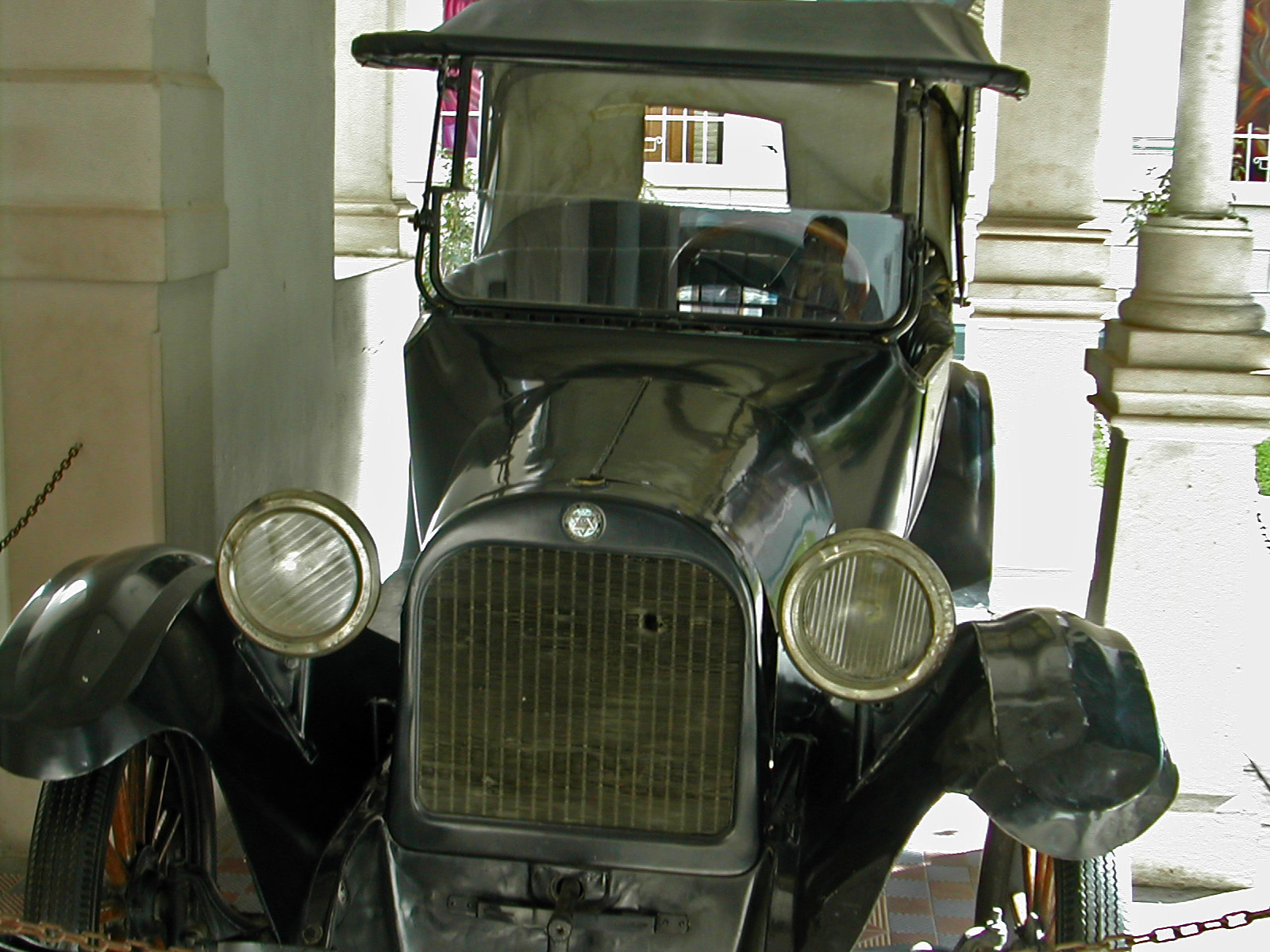
The 1919 Dodge roadster in which Villa was assassinated, displayed in the museum's courtyard.

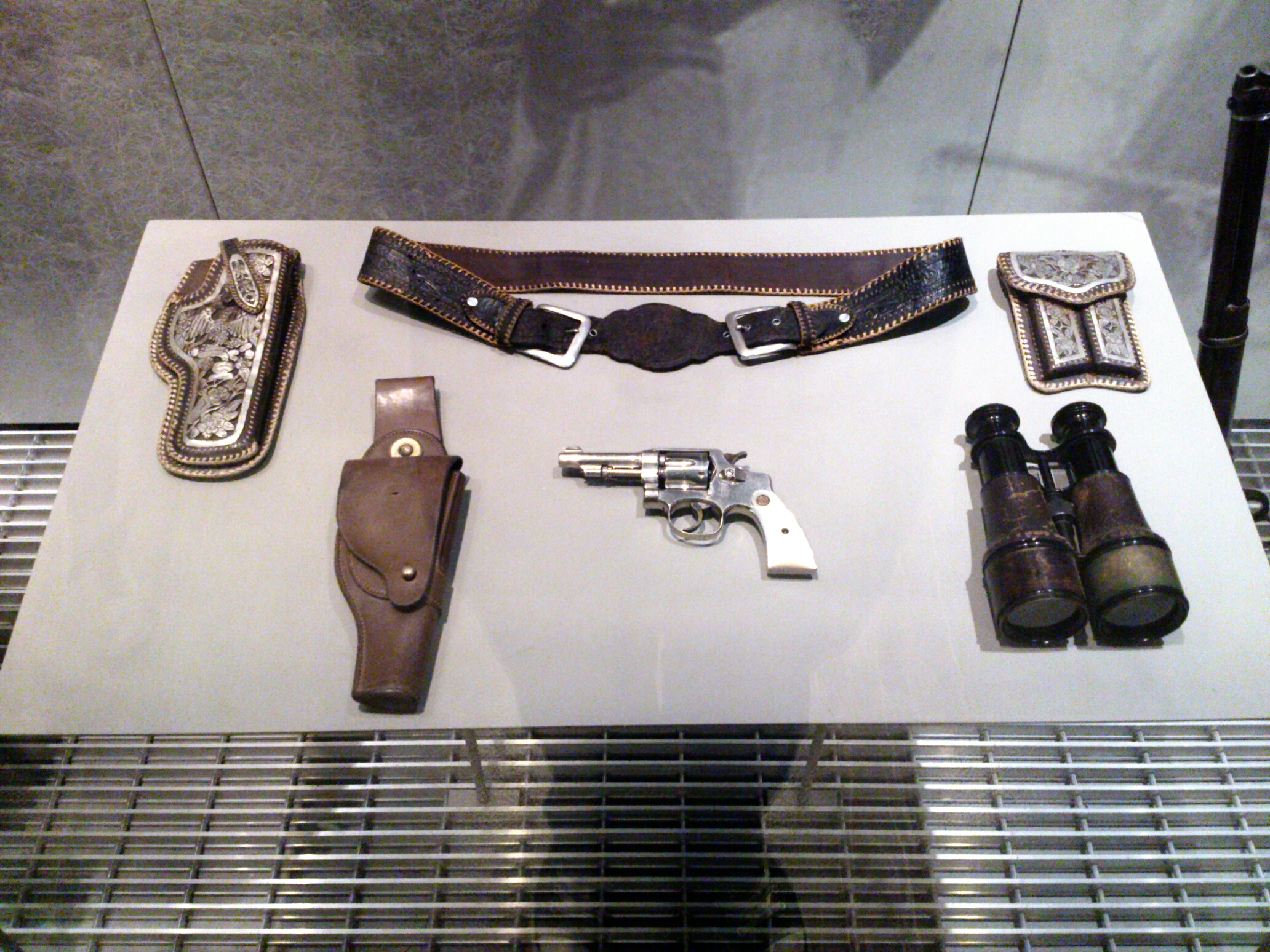
The weapons used by Francisco "Pancho" Villa

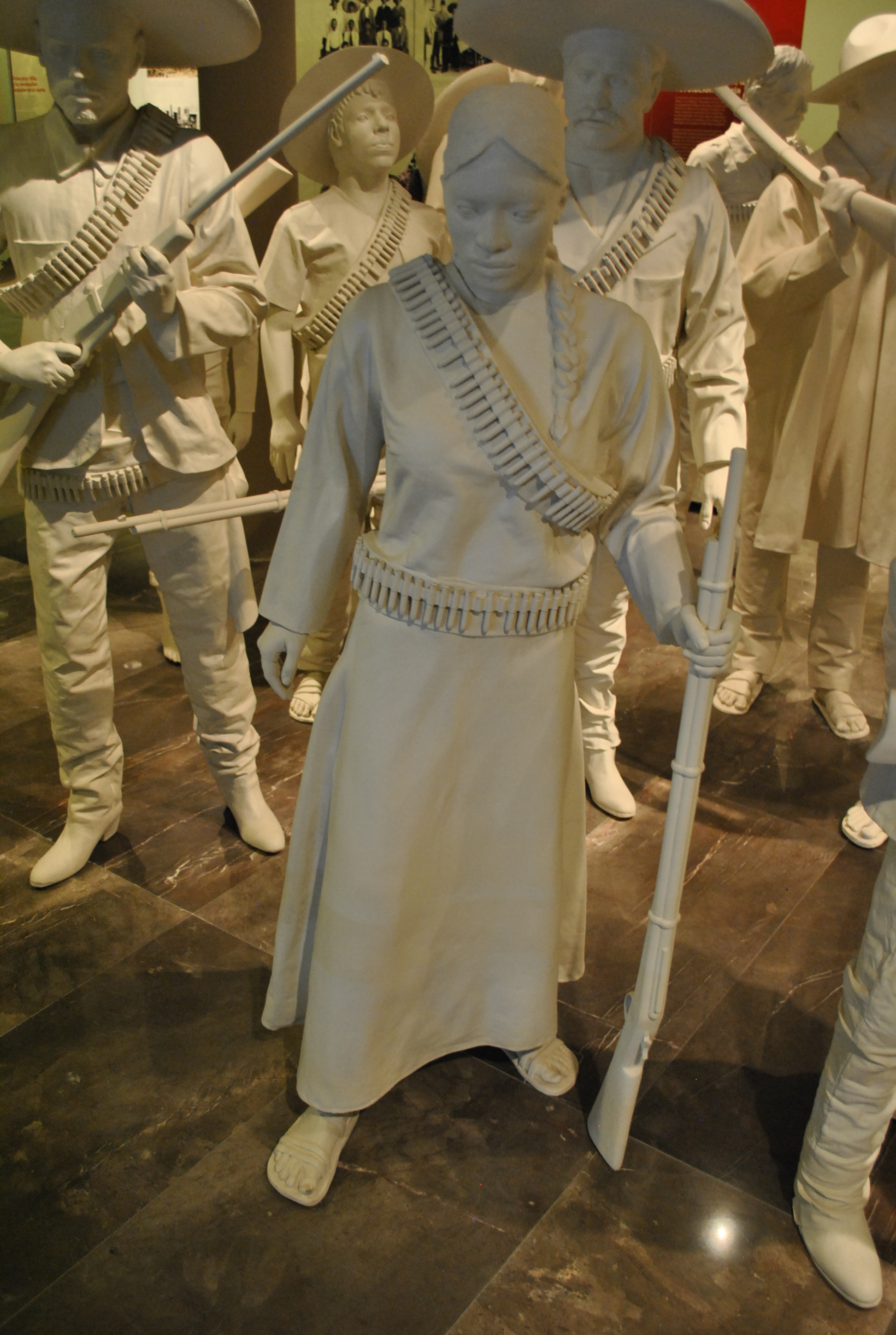
Depiction of the Adelita, a famous corridos of the Mexican Revolution
