= Long Meg of Westminster =

English innkeeper (fl. 1553)

Margaret Barnes, known in history under her sobriquet Long Meg of Westminster (fl. 1553), was an English innkeeper. She is an historic person, but is also the subject of a number of legends and fictional or unconfirmed stories and anecdotes.

== History ==
Long Meg may have been born Margaret Cleefe, who is found in a contemporaneous register marrying a Richard Barnes on 22 November 1551.

Margaret Barnes was from Lancashire but settled in London early in her life. She was a camp follower laundress in the English army during Henry VIII's campaign to Boulogne 1543–44, during which she is claimed to have shown great courage by throwing scalding water and stones at French soldiers.

Upon her return to London, she married a soldier. She also opened a successful tavern which was frequented by soldiers in Islington.

Long Meg is described as a tall and muscular woman, who threatened to fight herself anyone who caused fights in her tavern. In May 1561, she voluntarily appeared before the Bridewell Board of Governors to clear her name following rumors that she ran a bawdy house. This was instigated by the arrests of several of her associates who were investigated for prostitution. Following this, she moved to Westminster, where a year later she was accused of similar charges.

Legend says that Long Meg was buried at Westminster Abbey.

== Cultural legacy ==
Long Meg is the subject of a number of legends and fictional or unconfirmed stories and anecdotes.

The Life and Pranks of Long Meg of Westminster was published in 1582.

The now lost play Long Meg of Westminster was performed twelve times by The Admiral's players from 14 February 1595 to 4 October 1595. It was briefly revived for four further performances between November 1596 and 28 January 1597.

In 1750, The Life and Death of Long Meg of Westminster was featured in The Ballad-singers Basket. A Choice Collection of Pretty Pennyworths.

Long Meg was referenced by characters in books and plays such as in Thomas Dekker and John Webster's 1605 work Westward Ho!, Nathan Field's 1611 work Ammends for Ladies, and in a poem in the 1640 collection The Womens Sharpe Revenge by Mary "Tattle-well" and Joane "Hit-him-home."

Long Meg was later featured in 18th-century chapbooks (inexpensive booklets collecting oral tales), which recount that:

"Meg being a Laundress in the town [Bolougne], raised the best of women, and with a halberd in her hand, came to the walls, on which some of the French had entered, and threw scalding water and stones at them, that she had often obliged them to quit the town before the soldiers were up in arms…"

She is usually depicted as a heroine in these chapbook tales for her military victory against the French, but her strength is sometimes ridiculed later in the stories.
