= Manifiesto a la Nación =

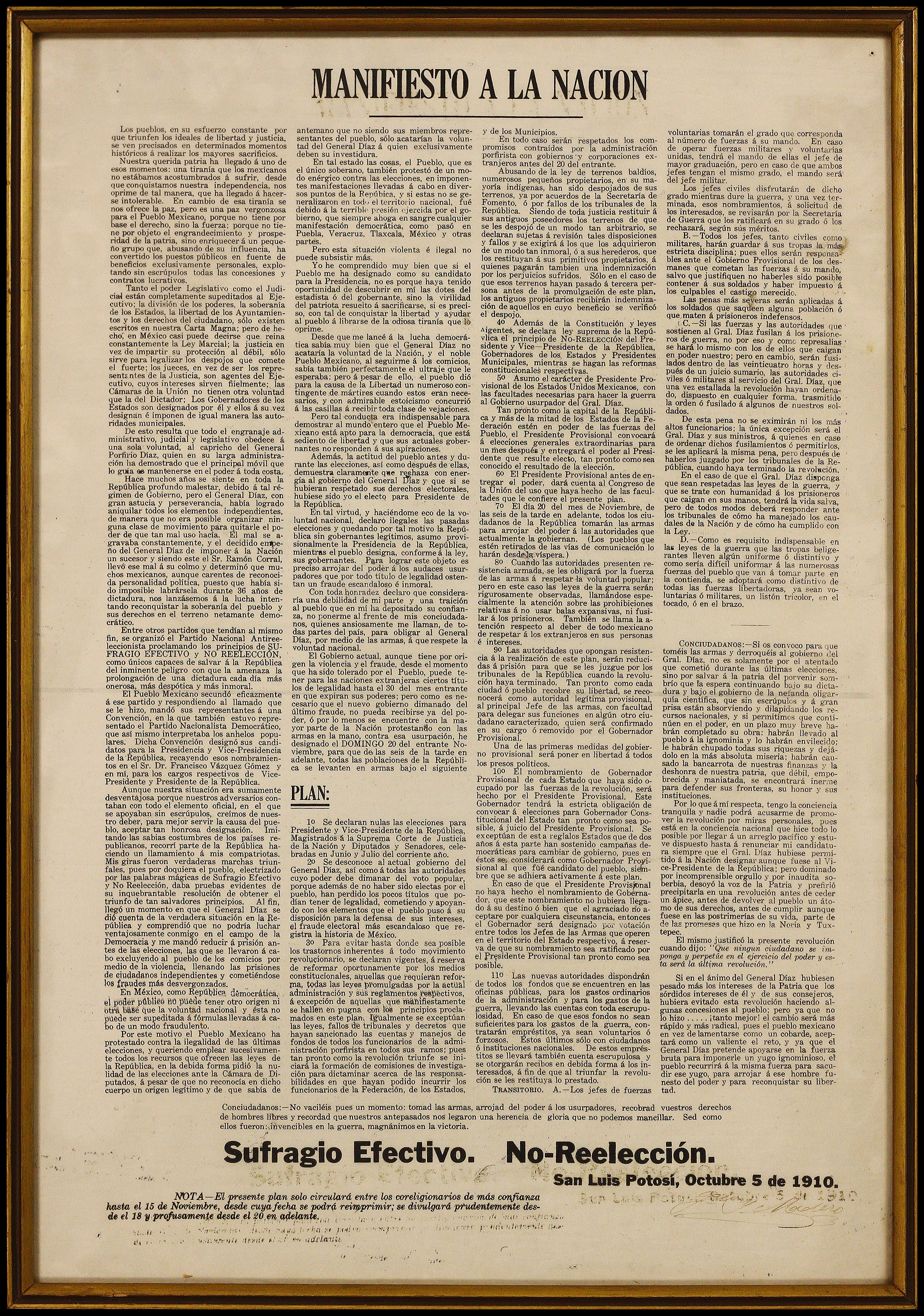
Manifesto to the Nation 5 October 1910

Manifiesto a la Nación is a document written by Francisco I. Madero on 5 October 1910 in San Luis Potosí, Mexico. The text begins with a message directed to the Mexican people and describes a plan in twelve articles. The first article declares invalid the elections from June and July 1910 for president, vice president, magistrates to the Supreme Court of Justice of the Nation, deputies and senators. In the second article he disowned the government of Porfirio Díaz and all the authorities unelected by the people.

The third article declares that the law on uncultivated land took advantage of small landowners and mostly dispossessed indigenous people arbitrarily. Madero proposes, in the name of justice, the restoration to the ancient possessors and demands to those who purchased in immoral form those lands to return them to their rightful owners in addition to paying them a compensation for the suffered damages. Only in the case that these lands have been sold to third persons before the promulgation of this plan, the ancient owners will receive compensation of those in whose profit verified the undress.

One of the articles with more impact in this Manifest it is the 4º, where it is declared as Supreme Law of the Republic the principle of NO-REELECTION of the president and vice-president of the Republic, governors of the states and municipal presidents.

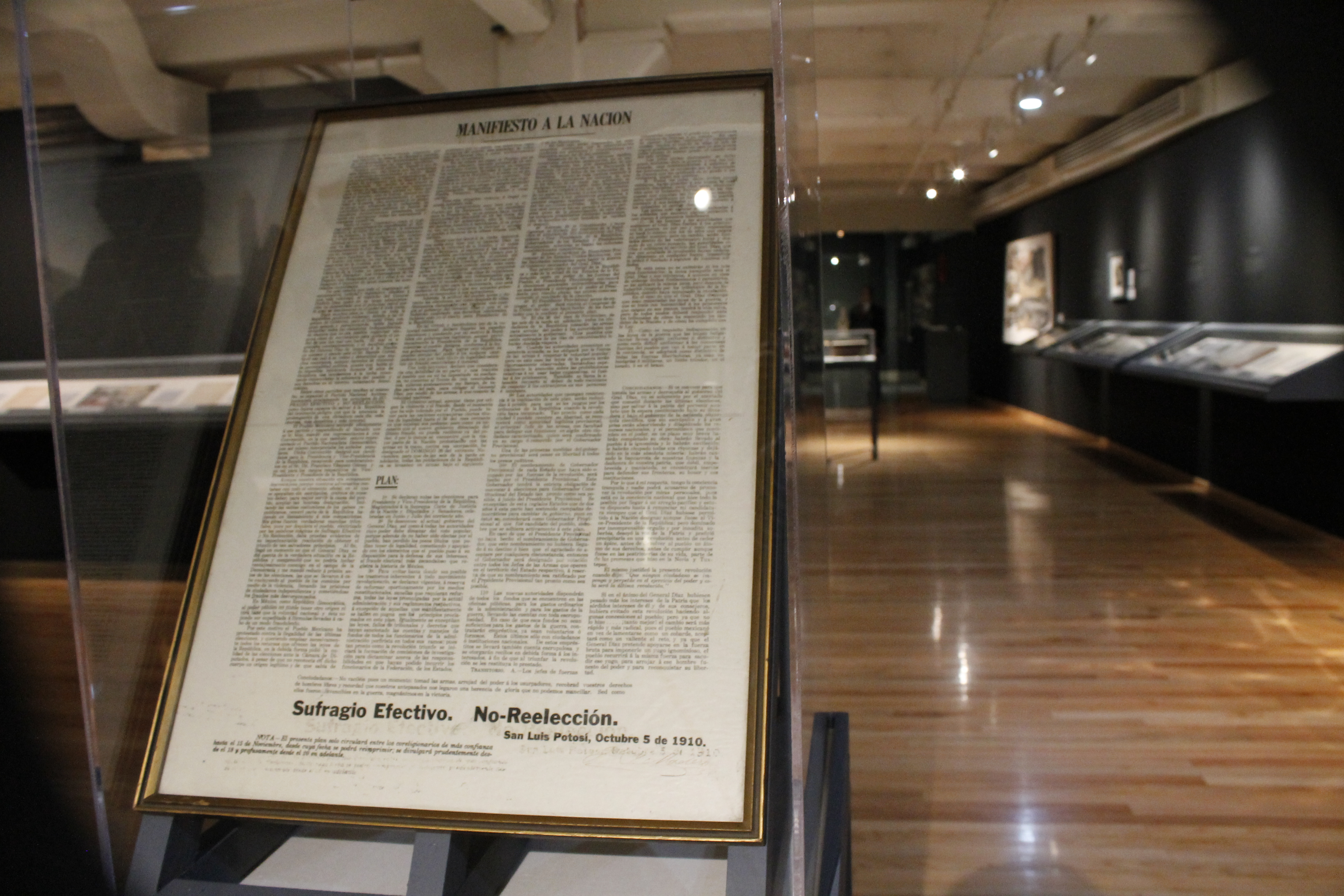
Manifiesto a la Nación exposed in the Museum Soumaya of Plaza Loreto

In the 5th article of this manifest, Madero assumes the charge of provisional president of the Mexican United States, calling for extraordinary elections a month afterwards, when the half of the States of the Federation are in power of the people, promising give the power to the president that results elect. Call to all the citizens of the Republic in the 7th article to take the weapons to launch of the power to the authorities the day 20 November at 6 pm. In articles 8 and 9 respectively specifies that when the authorities shows armed resistance, people will force them by strength to respect the popular decisions and to those who resist to this plan will be apprehended and subjects will trial at the end of the revolution.

== Historical context ==
Madero made three tours to promote anti reelection groups with the goal of instituting an annual convention in April 1910, in which it would constitute the National Party Anti reelection and would designate the elections candidates for June. Madero was apprehended by order of the district judge of San Luis Potosí while he was in Monterrey, accused of inciting rebellion, was the reason because he was moved and confined to the prison of the State. Forty-five days afterwards he was released on bail, although without the possibility to go out of the State. During this same period the presidential elections happened.
