= Amelio Robles Ávila =

Mexican colonel of the Mexican Revolution

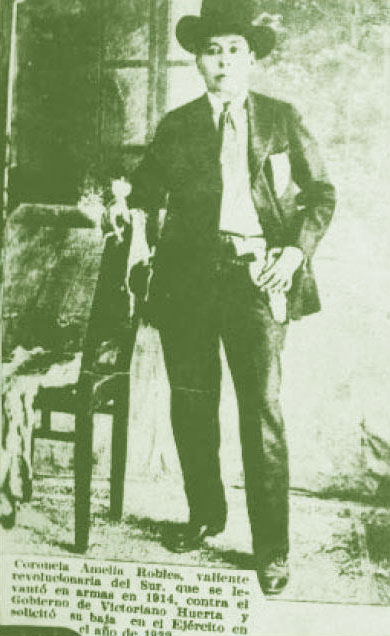
- Robles in 1915
- Born: Amelia Robles Ávila; 3 November 1889; Xochipala, Guerrero, Mexico
- Died: 9 December 1984 (aged 95); Xochipala, Guerrero, Mexico
- Spouse: Ángela Torres

Amelio Robles Ávila (3 November 1889 – 9 December 1984) was a colonel during the Mexican Revolution. Assigned female at birth, Robles lived openly as a transgender man from age 24 until his death at age 95.

== Early life ==
Robles was born Amelia Robles Ávila on 3 November 1889 in Xochipala, Guerrero, to Casimiro Robles and Josefa Ávila. Robles had two older siblings, Teódulo and Prisca.

Casimiro was a wealthy farmer who owned 42 hectares of land and a small mezcal factory. Robles was three years old when Casimiro died, and a few years later Josefa married Jesús Martinez, one of the ranch workers who took care of the livestock. Josefa and Jesús had three more children, Luis, Concepción and Jesús Martínez Ávila. They raised the children in the Catholic religion. Robles studied until the fourth grade at the school for young ladies in Chilpancingo.

From a young age, Robles showed an interest in activities that were considered masculine, learning to tame horses and handling weapons, and becoming an excellent marksman and rider. Before joining the army, he was treasurer in a Maderistas club in Xochipala.

== Army life ==
Robles joined the army in 1911 or 1912, perhaps when General Juan Andreu Almazán passed through Xochipala in 1911 as pressure mounted against Porfirio Díaz to resign as president.

Between August and November 1911, Robles was sent to the Gulf of Mexico on a commission in order to obtain money from oil companies for the revolutionary cause. Two years later, Robles began to dress as a man and demanded to be treated as such. (Robles was not alone as a person assigned female presenting as male in the Mexican army at the time. Maria de la Luz Barrera and Ángel(a) Jiménez also adopted male identities during the war.) From 1913 to 1918, Robles fought as "el coronel Robles" with the Zapatistas under the command of Jesús H. Salgado, Heliodoro Castillo, and Encarnación Díaz. Robles gained the respect of peers and superiors as a capable military leader, and was eventually given his own command.

In 1919, some time after Emiliano Zapata was killed, Robles and 315 men under his command joined the forces of Alvaro Obregón, and in 1920 fought with them in the Agua Prieta Revolt which brought an end to the government of Venustiano Carranza. In 1924, Robles supported General Alvaro Obregón against the Delahuertist rebellion under the command of General Adrián Castrejón, where the Delahuertista general Marcial Cavazos died and Robles was hurt.

Following the military phase of the Revolution, Robles supported revolutionary general Álvaro Obregón when the latter was president of Mexico in 1920–1924; Robles fought with Obregón's forces to put down the 1923 rebellion of Adolfo de la Huerta. When Robles settled in Iguala for a time after the revolution, a group of men are said to have attacked him wanting to reveal his anatomy; he killed two in self-defense. In 1939 he supported Almazán in the presidential election.

In 1948, Robles received the medical certificate required to officially enter the Confederation of Veterans of the Revolution. The medical revision confirmed that Robles had received six bullet wounds.

== Awards ==
In 1970, the Mexican Secretary of National Defense recognized Robles as a veteran (veterano) of the Revolution. Toward the end of his life, Robles received various decorations acknowledging distinguished military service: a decoration as a veteran of the Mexican Revolution, and the Mexican Legion of Honor; in 1973 or 1974, Robles was also decorated with the Revolutionary Merit award (Medalla al mérito revolucionario).

== Personal life and death ==
Robles met Ángela Torres in Apipilulco in the 1930s, and they later married. They adopted a daughter together, Regula Robles Torres. Both became estranged from Robles later in life.

On his deathbed, Robles supposedly made two requests: to receive honors for his military service and to be dressed as a woman in order to commend his soul to God. Neither request was ever confirmed to be true, and Robles had already received several military honors. Furthermore, Robles's death certificate notes that he lost the ability to speak more than a year before dying.

Robles died 9 December 1984, aged 95.

== Gender identity and legacy ==
According to historian Gabriela Cano Ortega, Robles adopted a male identity not as a survival strategy but because of a strong desire to be a man. Robles's male identity was accepted by family, society, and the Mexican government, and Robles lived as a man from the age of 24 until his death. According to a former neighbor, if anyone called Robles a woman or Doña (an honorific for women, similar to English Lady), he would threaten them with a pistol. Robles has therefore been described by historians as transgender.

Robles has been both commemorated as a male hero of the Mexican Revolution and iconized as a female warrior. A public school was named after him using the masculine version of his name, confirming the official recognition of his identity by the local government. His tombstone bears the feminine version of his name, and there is a museum in Xochipala celebrating "Coronela Amelia Robles", recognizing him as a "woman fighter". A 1951 children's book entitled El Coyote: Corrido de la Revolución creates an image of "La Coronela Amelia Robles" through both visual and written elements.

The image of Robles in his uniform was drawn on as inspiration for a section of a drag performance depicting soldaderas.

== See also ==
- Albert Cashier, American Civil War soldier
- James Barry (surgeon)
- Mexican Armed Forces
