= Petra Herrera =

Soldadera of Mexican Revolution

Petra Herrera, also known as "Pedro Herrera" (June 29, 1887 – February 14, 1916), was a Mexican "soldadera" (a soldier in the insurgent troops of the Mexican Revolution).

== Biography ==
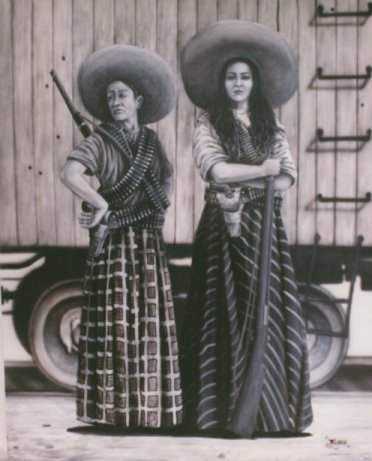
Women of the Mexican Revolution ("adelitas" or "soldaderas") with crossed bandoliers.

Petra Herrera, dressed as a man and with the pseudonym Pedro Herrera, actively participated in many battles of the Mexican Revolution in order to join the league commanded by General Francisco (Pancho) Villa. She joined the military during her mid-twenties. She had an excellent reputation and demonstrated exemplary leadership. She was able, after a time, to reveal that she was a woman, but she was refused military rank and was removed from the army.

Female participation in the Revolution was common, but in activities such as food and accompaniment. Herrera's involvement was exemplary. She was able to keep her identity as a woman a secret due to ingenious strategies, such as pretending to shave her beard every morning, thereby avoiding questions about facial hair. She eventually reached the rank of captain and led a brigade of 200 men.

Although she had some victories, Pancho Villa refused to give military credit to a woman and would not permit Petra Herrea to serve as a General. As a result of being removed from Villa's forces, Herrera formed her own brigade, exclusively for women. She fought in the second battle of Torreón on May 30, 1914, with 400 other women.

Her strategy of attack included exploding bridges. She had a great capacity for leadership. This manifested once her feminine identity was revealed and she formed a group of soldaderas which fought some battles next to the troops of General Villa. One of her most important triumphs was the previously mentioned second battle of Torreón, Coahuila, on May 30, 1914. Cosme Mendoza Chavira, another follower of Villa, said "Ella fue quien tomo Torreón y apago las luces cuando entraron en la ciudad" (She was the one who took Torreón and turned out the lights when they entered the city.") She eventually commanded a brigade of over 1,000 women, yet, conventional history does not say anything about the participation of Petra Herrera because Villa assigned her role in the revolution to an unknown woman.

Some time later, her all-woman army was dissolved by superior orders and Petra Herrera ended up working as a spy, under the disguise of a girl in a canteen in the state of Chihuahua. Some sources say she worked in Jiménez, Chihuahua, while others say her work was in Ciudad Juárez. Both versions agree, however, that one night a group of bandits, in a drunken state, insulted and shot Petra Herrera. Although she survived the attack she ultimately died of wounds that became infected.
