= María Quinteras de Meras =

Mexican revolutionary

María Quinteras de Meras was a Mexican revolutionary and soldadera who rose to the rank of colonel. She dressed as a man and fought in ten battles between 1910 and 1913. Her fighting was so fierce she was thought to have supernatural powers.

De Meras joined Pancho Villa's army in 1910. She fought alongside her husband, who was a captain under her command. She refused payment for her services to the revolution.
