= Mexican Legion of Honor =

- Graphic based on the decoration awarded to members of the Legión de Honor Mexicana

Awarded by (Mexico) Consejo de Honor de la Legión de Honor Militar Mexicana
- Type: State order of merit
- Established: 1 February 1949
- Country: Mexico
- Eligibility: soldiers and others with outstanding contributions to defense of Mexico
- Founder: Gilberto R. Limón and Miguel Alemán Valdés
- President of Mexico: Claudia Sheinbaum
- Secretary of National Defense (Mexico): Luis Cresencio Sandoval Gonzalez
- Drawing based on the emblem used by members while in civilian clothes.

The modern Mexican Legion of Honor (Spanish: Legión de Honor Mexicana) is an order of merit awarded to soldiers, veterans, and others who have made outstanding contributions to the national defense, security, or sovereignty of Mexico. An earlier, post-revolutionary version was organized as a military reserve force.

== Precursor ==
A forerunner to the modern Legion was founded in 1917 under President Venustiano Carranza to provide an "honorable location for excess officers of the Constitutional Army." It was available for use as a reserve force in case of national emergency, and also provided training for new recruits.

== History ==
The modern Mexican Legion of Honor was created in a 1949 decree by President Miguel Alemán Valdés to "honor soldiers during their lifetime" who had contributed to the national defense, or who had contributed in some form to the social achievements enshrined in the Constitution. (Note: ...honrar en vida a los militares que contribuyeron de manera relevante en la defensa militar de la Nación o que de alguna forma contribuyeron a lograr las conquistas sociales plasmadas en nuestra Constitución. ——DOF 2015) Eligibility changes included admission for those who had served the country, or completed at least thirty years of active military service.

A 1994 amendment to the original act established some organizational changes, including an official name change to Legión de Honor Militar Mexicana, and added eligibility to those who had "participated in the most preeminent events" of Mexican history, carried out "heroic actions", or in some way contributed to the military defense of the nation, to guaranteeing national security, or to maintain national sovereignty and independence. (Note: ...para honrar en vida a los militares que hayan participado en los hechos sobresalientes de nuestra historia, así como a quienes realicen actos heroicos o en cualquier forma contribuyan a la defensa militar de la Nación, a la garantía de la seguridad nacional y a lograr mantener la soberanía e independencia nacionales. —DOF 2015) It also established a Council to have the final word on eligibility and defined more exactly the criteria for members of the Navy and the Air Force to be honored. A 2003 law refers to it as a decoration or award (condecoración).

A 2015 amendment recognized the original, purely military nature of the organization, but taking into account an extended period of peacetime, expanded the eligibility to certain outstanding non-military recipients as well. (Note: ...se podrán otorgar reconocimientos y medallas para honrar en vida a las personas que realicen... [emphasis added] —DOF 2015)

== Women and the Legion ==
Although some women had fought valiantly in the Mexican Revolution, even in dangerous combat conditions, and had achieved military rank up to captain and colonel based on the merits, their grade and achievements were officially annulled almost immediately after the revolution. In 1916, circular #78 by the Secretary of War declared that "all military appointments of women and girls are null and void, whatever their contributions may have been." This not only blocked their path to reenlist in the army, and the right to belong to the Legion of Honor in their capacity as veterans, but also blocked their military retirement pensions. When peace came, they not only bypassed women for honors and pensions, but ignored their contributions entirely, as their mere presence would do violence to a patriarchal institution. The 1949 reorganization opened the membership first to civilians, and then to women. Although some women were recognized as members, without recognizing either their military rank or their pensions.

== List of General Commanders ==
- Gral. de Div. Cándido Aguilar Vargas, February 1, 1949, to October 30, 1950.
- Gral. de Div. Federico Montes, November 1, 1950, to December 1, 1950.
- Gral. de Div. Francisco L. Urquizo, January 1, 1951, to January 1, 1953.
- Gral. de Div. Juan Jiménez Méndez, January 1, 1953, to November 16, 1954.
- Gral. de Div. Aureo L. Calles, November 16, 1954, to November 20, 1957.
- Gral. de Div. Ramón F. Iturbe, January 1, 1958, to February 16, 1966.
- Gral. de Div. Benito Bernal Miranda, February 16, 1966, to June 15, 1970.
- Gral. de Div. Javier Echeverría Adame Marquina, June 16, 1970, to January 11, 1987.
- Gral. de Div. Francisco González Swain, January 11, 1987, to June 30, 1987.
- Gral. de Div. Joaquín Felipe Leyzaola, June 1, 1987, to June 16, 1991.
- Gral. de Div. P.A. Héctor Berthier Aguiluz, August 9, 1991, to August 19, 1995.
- Gral. de Bgda. I.I. Ret. Jorge Mario Rojas Madrigal, August 20, 1995, to November 1995.
- Gral. de Div. DEM. Salvador Revueltas Olvera, November 16, 1995, to October 3, 2004.
- Gral. de Div. DEM. Ret. Alfredo Hernández Pimentel, October 16, 2004, to June 30, 2021.
- Gral. de Div. E.M. Ret. Luis Arturo Oliver Cen, July 2021 to current.

== See also ==
- Porfirio Díaz
- Mexican Armed Forces

== Sources ==
- "DECRETO que reforma, adiciona y deroga diversas disposiciones del diverso que creó la Legión de Honor Mexicana" [DECREE which amends and adds and delegates various provisions to the act which created the Mexican Legion of Honor.]. Diario Oficial de la Federación (in Spanish). 22 November 1994.
- "DECRETO que reforma y adiciona diferentes disposiciones del diverso que crea la Legión de Honor Mexicana" [DECREE which amends and adds various provisions which created the Mexican Legion of Honor]. Diario Oficial de la Federación (in Spanish). 12 November 2015.
- Rocha Islas, Martha Eva (2000) [1st pub:1993]. "Los textos narrativos y su importancia historiográfica: Las Memorias de Leonor Villegas de Magnón". In Gutiérrez, Ramón A.; Padilla, Genaro M.; Herrera-Sobek, María (eds.). Recovering the U.S. Hispanic Literary Heritage. Houston, Texas: Arte Publico Press. pp. 85–86. ISBN 978-1-55885-251-8. OCLC 965124807.
- Navarro, Aaron W. (1 January 2010). Political Intelligence and the Creation of Modern Mexico, 1938-1954. University Park, Penna.: Penn State Press. ISBN 978-0-271-03706-6. OCLC 537294233.
- Camara de deputados del H. Congreso de la Unión de los Estados Unidos Mexicanos (2011-05-08) [1st pub. 30 Oct 2003]. Ley de Ascensos y Recompensas del Ejército y Fuerza Aérea Mexicanos [Act on Promotions and Rewards of the Mexican Army and Air Force] (in Spanish) (Last amendment ed.). Nisi Lex Editores. GGKEY:FSW23L9DXBL.
