= Margarita Ortega (magonist) =

Mexican magonist (1871–1913)

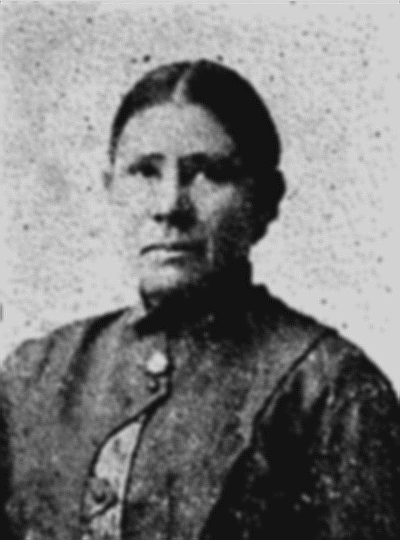

Personal details
- Born: Margarita Ortega Valdés; 1871 Sonora, Mexico
- Died: 24 November 1913 (aged 41–42) Mexicali, Baja California, Mexico
- Cause of death: Execution by firing squad
- Party: Mexican Liberal Party
- Spouse: Pascual Gortari
- Children: Irineo, Andrés and Rosaura Gortari

Military service
- Branch/service: Liberal Army Confederation
- Years of service: 1910–1913
- Battles/wars: Magonista rebellion of 1911: Capture of Mexicali

Margarita Ortega Valdés (1871 – 24 November 1913) was a Mexican anarchist revolutionary. Born into a wealthy family, she joined the Mexican Liberal Party (PLM) and participated in the Magonista rebellion of 1911. Together with her daughter, Rosaura Gortari, she took part in the capture of Mexicali from the Porfiriato, running supplies for the Magonista rebels. When the city was taken by the forces of Francisco I. Madero, she was exiled from Mexico to Arizona, where her daughter died. She then returned to Mexico in order to fight against Victoriano Huerta, but was captured, tortured and executed by firing squad.

After her death, Ortega was eulogised by PLM leader Ricardo Flores Magón as an exemplary revolutionary woman, changing the attitudes of the party leadership towards women's participation in the Mexican Revolution.

== Biography ==
Margarita Ortega Valdés was born in Sonora, into a well-off mestizo family. She reportedly was married three times during her life. With Pascual Gortari, she had two sons: Irineo and Andrés; and one daughter: Rosaura.

At the turn of the 20th century, the Mexican Liberal Party (PLM) was the only political party that extended full membership rights to women. This inspired many women to join the party, lead strikes among female textile and cigarette workers, and openly rebel against the Porfiriato. Among these women were Ortega and her daughter Rosaura, who joined the party in 1910; Ortega left her more conservative husband in the process, as he did not agree with her political ideology. In his dramatisation of the encounter, PLM leader Ricardo Flores Magón depicts her as saying:

I love you, but I also love those who suffer; and I fight and risk my life for them. I don’t want to see any more men and women giving their energy, their health, their minds, their future to enrich the bourgeoisie. I don’t want men to command men any longer. I’m resolved to continue fighting for the cause of the [Mexican Liberal Party], and if you’re a man, come with me to the battle. If that’s not the case, forget me; I don’t want to be the partner of a coward.

With the outbreak of the Mexican Revolution, the PLM initially appealed for women to pressure their husbands to take up arms in the revolution, upholding traditional gender roles that placed women in a subordinated and supportive role to men in armed revolution. But as Ortega believed in gender equality, she broke from the PLM's party line on this matter and decided to take up arms herself. According to a New York Times editorial published in May 1911, women ended up playing "a spectacular part in the revolution".

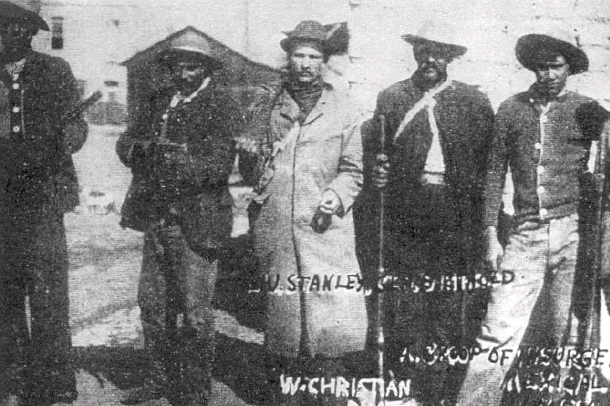
Magonista forces during the Capture of Mexicali

Ortega and her daughter rose up against the government in Baja California, joining the Magonista rebellion of 1911. On 29 January 1911, Ortega participated in the Magonist capture of Mexicali from the Porfiriato. She and her daughter helped to smuggle supplies into the city from the United States, bringing them weapons, ammunition and dynamite, which they hid in the lining of their clothes. She also helped to nurse the wounded.

After the victory of Francisco I. Madero's constitutionalist forces, the Magonist Rodolfo Gallegos defected to Madero's side and took Mexicali back for the Mexican state. After Ortega was arrested by the Maderists, she reportedly said to the official that arrested her: "[t]hey will take me to Ensenada and shoot me on foot, as a man; but you, traitor, they will shoot you from behind, as a coward.” Instead, Gallegos exiled her and her daughter from Mexico, threatening that they would be killed if they returned. Without food or water, they made their way through the desert towards the Mexico–United States border. They eventually reached Yuma, Arizona, where they were arrested by American border guards, but friends helped them to escape to Phoenix under assumed identities.

The stress of the journey made Rosaura fall gravely ill and die, forcing Ortega to return to Mexico without her. Ortega crossed into Sonora via Sonoyta, where she joined up with the Magonista Natividad Cortés, with whom she attempted to reorganise the revolutionary movement in Northern Sonora. But Gallegos, who had been put in charge of the Sonora border guards, came across the two Magonistas and arrested them; Cortés was shot and Ortega taken back to Baja California. There she fell into the hands of the forces of Victoriano Huerta, who imprisoned her in a dungeon on 20 November 1913.

She was tortured for four days by her captors, forcing her to confess that she was a member of the PLM, although she refused to give up any names of other PLM members. On the night of 24 November 1913, Ortega was executed by firing squad; according to Flores Magón, she died with a smile on her face.

== Legacy ==
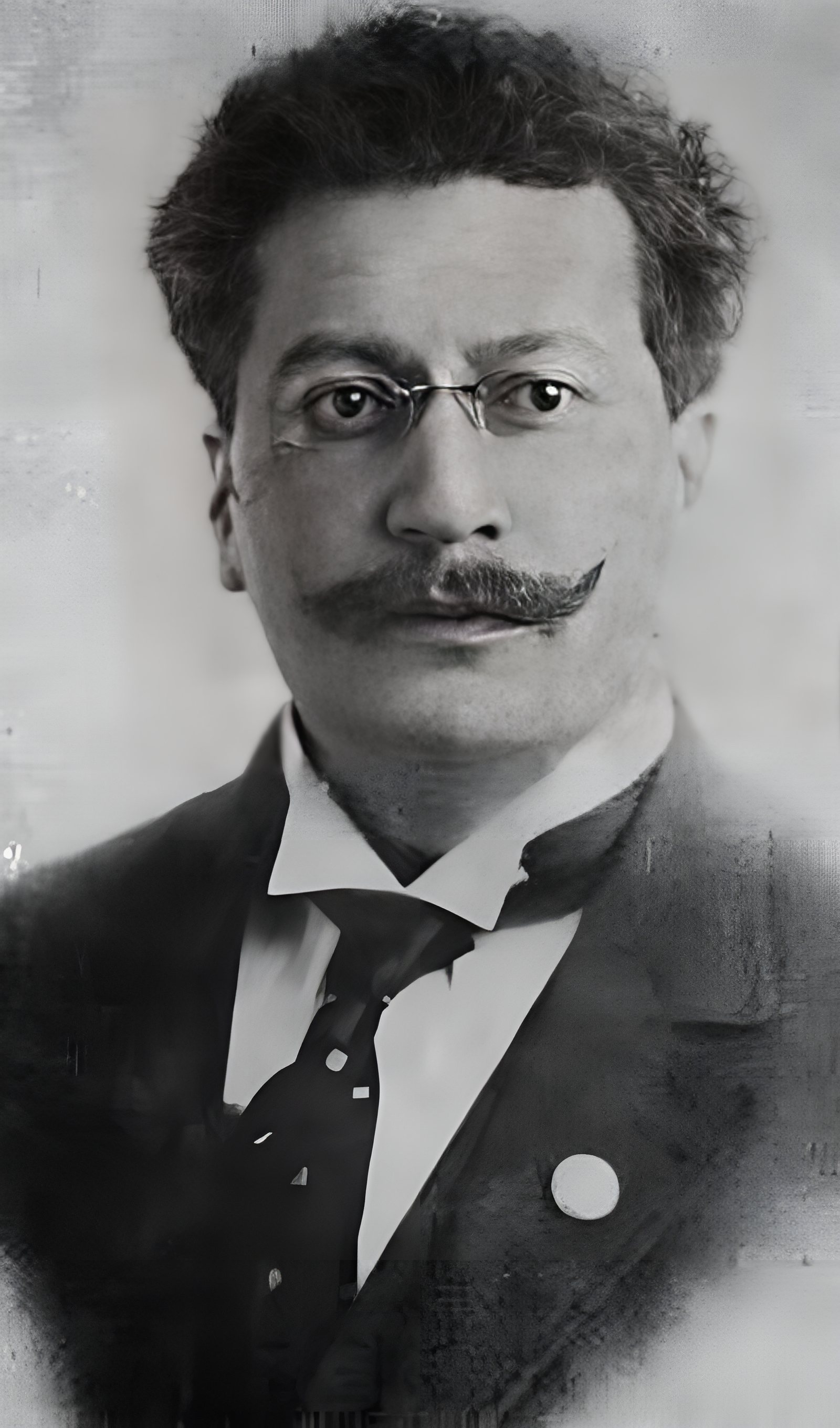
Ricardo Flores Magón, the leader of the Mexican Liberal Party (PLM), whose eulogy of Ortega held her up as an exemplary revolutionary woman

Following her death, Ortega received notable praise from Ricardo Flores Magón, who held her up as an exemplary revolutionary woman due to her altruism and patriotism. He found that Ortega had stood in counter-position to his calls for women to convince men to join the fight. He in turn was convinced to change his policy, admitting that women had an active role to play in the Revolution. Following her example, he began seeking to convince women to fight alongside men. In his eulogy to her, Flores Magón described her as:

An able horsewoman and an expert in the use of firearms, Margarita crossed the enemy lines and smuggled arms, munitions, dynamite, whatever was needed, to the comrades on the field of action. More than once her boldness and coolness saved her from falling into the clutches of the forces of tyranny. Margarita Ortega had a great heart: from her horse, or from behind a rock, she could shoot down a government soldier, and a little later once could see her caring for the wounded, feeding the convalescents, or providing words of consolation to the widows and orphans. Apostle, warrior, nurse – this exceptional woman was all of these simultaneously.

In giving this eulogy, Flores Magón's aim was to inspire the reader to take up arms, both through Ortega's bravery as well as her husband's "cowardice". According to American queer studies scholar Benjamin H. Abbott, Flores Magón's eulogy displayed an acceptance of non-traditional gender roles, with Ortega herself having represented a queering of such cultural norms.

== Bibliography ==
- Abbott, Benjamin H. (2018). ""That Monster Cannot Be a Woman:" Queerness and Treason in the Partido Liberal Mexicano". Anarchist Developments in Cultural Studies. 2018 (1): 9–28. ISSN 1923-5615.
- Cockcroft, James D. (2010). "Mexicans Rise Up, 1910-2010: Similarities and Differences". Mexico's Revolution: Then and Now. Monthly Review Press. pp. 13–34. ISBN 978-1-58367-224-2. LCCN 2010035832.
- Espino Becerril, Claudia (2015). "Mujeres Mexicanas Anarquistas". In Domínguez Prieto, Olivia (ed.). El Anarquismo en México (PDF) (in Spanish). Palabra de Clío. pp. 147–167. ISBN 978-607-95645-9-9.
- González, Gabriela (2018). Redeeming La Raza: Transborder Modernity, Race, Respectability, and Rights. Oxford University Press. ISBN 9780199914142. LCCN 2017056469.
- Guidotti-Hernández, Nicole M. (2019). "Partido Liberal Mexicano: Intimate Betrayals: Enrique Flores Magón, Paula Carmona, and the Gendered History of Denunciation". Southern California Quarterly. 101 (2): 127–162. doi:10.1525/scq.2019.101.2.127. ISSN 0038-3929. S2CID 194256629.
- Guidotti-Hernández, Nicole M. (2021). Archiving Mexican Masculinities in Diaspora. Duke University Press. ISBN 9781478013242. LCCN 2020044111.
- López-Calvo, Ignacio (2008). "The Spanish-Language Crónica in Los Angeles: Francisco P. Ramírez and Ricardo Flores Magón". Journal of Spanish Language Media. 1: 125–138. ISSN 1940-0810.
- Lozoya, Nallely (2023). "A Vision Without Borders: Magonismo and Mexican Women". Spectra Undergraduate Research Journal. 3 (1): 1–14. doi:10.9741/2766-7227.1023. ISSN 2766-7227. S2CID 259480220.
- Milian, Alberto (2018). Under a Perfect Sun: Ethnic Mexicans and the Left in Greater San Diego, 1900-1950 (PhD). Cornell University. doi:10.7298/X4765CJ4.
- Miner, Dylan (2010). "Ortega, Margarita (?–1914)". In Ness, Immanuel (ed.). The International Encyclopedia of Revolution and Protest. Wiley. p. 1. doi:10.1002/9781405198073.wbierp1715. ISBN 9781405198073.
- Samaniego López, Marco Antonio (1999). "El impacto del maderismo en Baja California, 1911" (PDF). Estudios de Historia Moderna y Contemporánea de México (in Spanish). 18: 89–120. ISSN 0185-2620. Archived from the original (PDF) on 9 July 2007.
- Turner, Ethel Duffy (1981). Devis, Rey (ed.). Revolution in Baja California: Ricardo Flores Magón's High Noon. Detroit: Blaine Ethridge. pp. 66–67. ISBN 0879170786.
- Weber, Devra A. (2006). "Mexican Revolution, Border Women in". In Ruíz, Vicki; Sánchez Korrol, Virginia (eds.). Latinas in the United States: A Historical Encyclopedia. Vol. 2. Indiana University Press. pp. 464–466. ISBN 0-253-34683-5. LCCN 2005034986.
