= Acayucan Rebellion =

Failed uprising in Mexico

- Part of the prelude to the Mexican Revolution
Date	30 September – 3 October 1906
Location	Acayucan, Veracruz, Mexico
Result	Rebellion defeated

Belligerents
Mexican Liberal Party	Porfiriato

Commanders and leaders
Hilario C. Salas; Roman Marin; Enrique Novoa	

The Acayucan Rebellion, also known as the Acayucan Uprising, was a brief uprising in Mexico, within the Acayucan municipality of the Mexican State of Veracruz, lasting from 30 September to 3 October 1906. It was part of a series of uprisings instigated by the Mexican Liberal Party, meant to start a revolt within Mexico against the regime of Porfirio Díaz. Though ultimately unsuccessful in its goal of igniting a revolt, the Acayucan Rebellion and the other uprisings before 1910 were early signs of the instability of the Porfiriato, and precursors to the Mexican Revolution.

== Background ==
Since the middle of the 19th century, Veracruz had been one of the primary regions behind the Mexican Industrial Revolution, due to possessing valleys whose rapidly descending rivers made ideal sites for the installation of textile factories, and by 1845, Veracruz, by number of factories and spindles, was the third largest in Mexico. This industrialization was initially driven largely by capital from the Banco de Avio and the community of French investors in Mexico, and later by massive foreign investment expressly encouraged by the Diaz regime as part of their drive to modernize Mexico.

This in turn had spurred massive growth in the state, especially during the Porfiriato, which saw the population within the Orizaba valley doubling from 1887 to 1906, and even many smaller towns and communities in the region being home to major industrial facilities in the state. Though this growth had initially been accompanied by large scale growth in the worker's living conditions, which had increased by 15% between 1877 and 1898, conditions had collapsed by the turn of the century, with wages falling back to 1877 levels, by then barely enough to afford a day's worth of food, which, when accompanied by the arbitrary imposition of fines by supervisors, saw many workers unable to provide for their family.

Working conditions in the state were, by the standard of the day, not considered overly cruel, but debilitating to laborers, with a fourteen or fifteen-hour workday beginning at five-thirty in the morning in the summer, with only one and a half hours per day allotted for meals. Workers in settlements controlled by textile companies also had to suffer from insufficient schools provided for their children, company policies prohibiting the hosting of friends, and outright criminal behavior, including the employment of child labor, sexual harassment, and coercion.

These conditions resulted in the textile industry becoming one of the most strike prone industries throughout the Porfiriato, as well as, following global economic trends that saw a dramatic decline in the price of henequen and cotton during the five years before the Revolution, one of the most militant labor forces in Mexico, creating a large pool of recruits from which the PLM were able to draw membership and sympathizers from within Veracruz.

The instigating force of the uprising, The Mexican Liberal Party, had been founded a year before the revolts in 1905 and had finalized their program on 1 July 1906, calling for the overthrow of the Diaz regime and enacting of a series of social and economic reforms to the Mexican state, which were considered progressive yet moderate. This ideological range allowed them to appeal to and recruit a wide array of Mexicans, especially among workers, motivated to action against the Diaz regime by either liberal or revolutionary ideals.

Ricardo Flores Magon, head of the ruling Junta of the MLP, which had been founded as a result of the politicization and persecution of Magon's newspaper, Regeneracion,had by then managed to settle in St. Louis, and used the publication of the party's program to usher in a period of increased growth in party membership, founding an auxiliary junta in Arizona, and many cells, organized around clubs, across Mexico.

The Governor of Veracruz during the revolts, Teodoro Dehesa, had been in power since 1892, and during his tenure had proven himself a strong advocate for conciliatory labor policy, having stepped into multiple labor disputes within the state, frequently managing to mediate peaceful settlements between workers and factory owners. This had made him both fairly popular within the state and had earned him the confidence of Diaz, who extended Dehesa a greater degree of autonomy in handling labor in the state than other governors. Dehesa, convinced that taking an intransigent attitude would only result in labor becoming further estranged from the government, chose to pursue policies that sought to co-opt PLM associated organizations, as well as ignoring orders from Diaz to perform mass arrests and surveillance of figures in the workers' movements, allowed for the PLM to propagandize and recruit to a greater degree in Veracruz than they were able to do in other non-border states, making Veracruz an important point in their planned revolution.

The Diaz regime also made preparations for a potential uprising they feared would be underway, even while publicly emphasizing that no such events could be taking place. The government, using privately hired detectives, raids upon PLM headquarters in Mexico, and cooperation from U.S Postal Service in intercepting the mail of the St. Louis Junta, managed to build an efficient spy network centered on the Junta, and developed a decent idea of the scope of the PLM's planned revolution

== Rebellion ==
Though the St. Louis Junta had originally planned to travel to the border to inaugurate the Revolution in September, Magon had grown concerned that the Diaz regime had received warning of an impending action, and wired Salas to instead go into hiding. However, Salas feared that such a delay would see his organization wither away, and believed that a rising would be joined by the rest of the country.

Salas' assault upon Acayucan, beginning at 11:00 P.M, initially met with great success, but quickly fell apart when Salas' became injured, taking a shot to the abdomen, causing his inexperienced force to panic and carry him off the battlefield in retreat.

More far off risings in the states of Coahuila and Tabasco also struck, though these cells were soon put down by government forces.

A major factor behind the defeat of the rebellion was the Cells' lack of money, and subsequent dearth of both ammunition and weapons, as well as possessing only a small force of recruits, meaning they could only launch small assaults before being forced to retreat, and being too cautious with their forces.

== Aftermath ==
The Regime used the involvement of Indians in the assault to cast the rebellion as simply a case of Indian discontent manifesting as a small thwarted attack, with no greater political motivation or revolutionary implications behind it. Many local American papers, eager to satisfy the curiosity over a potential rebellion, largely printed the government statement verbatim and unaltered as part of the front-page story, even reprinting rebukes by Diaz affiliated papers of other local papers questioning the official narrative. Other Papers, further afield who were less attached to the potential significance of the rebellion reported more altered versions of the government line emphasizing the attack, while some who could grasp the political significance simply focused on reporting the core point of the governments story, that the event held no political significance This suppression campaign had the intended effect of downplaying American concerns about potential revolution, seeing an advance on the stock market of both Mexican bonds, and of some American companies that operated in Mexico, following concerns of the potential harm a revolution would have on American business interests.

Following his retreat and laid low by his injury, Salas spent the remainder of the year in the hills, and was unable to support the Rio Blanco Strike a few months later. The PLM in Veracruz entered a period of dormancy throughout the next two years. Salas would not return to revolutionary action until he began to support the Anti-Reelctionist campaign and building up arms for what he suspected would be an outbreak of violence. Many of his former followers ultimately joined the forces of the Maderistas when the revolution broke out.

Soon after the failed rebellion, Magon organized a meeting of the Junta, however their meeting location had been revealed to the Diaz regime by traitors, who in turn informed U.S. authorities, who launched a raid upon the meeting. Though many members of the Junta were arrested, Magon managed to escape, and was soon able to reestablish contact with the rest of the Junta through codes and aliases, and began to rebuild the organization.

Following the failure of the rebellions of 1906, the PLM began to drift away from its founding moderate politics to an Anarchist organization with extensive plans for the restructuring of Mexican society. This was partly due to Ricardo Flores Magon blaming the lack of ammunition, which he viewed as the primary cause of the 1906 Revolt's failure, to a lack of financial backing by wealthy Liberals within Mexico.

Reforms made in light of the 1906 revolts, were ultimately a mixed bag for future PLM efforts. by 1910, economic reforms, as well as the upsurge in income from Regeneracion, and in contributions following the outbreak of the Mexican Revolution, left their cells much better off financially, though they still suffered from a dearth of recruits, with most cells still small in comparison to the regions they were expected to operate in, due in part to the greater organizational and financial systems the Anti-Reelectionists had access to, allowing them to attract a greater number of recruits. Further reforms also ordered revolutionary forces to not put down arms until the triumph of the revolution, which would ultimately be used to justify refusing to surrender to the Madero lead Interim Government, feeling that Madero had betrayed the revolution, helping to contribute to the next stage of the Mexican Revolution following Diaz's ouster.
