= Liberal Congress of San Luis =

The Liberal Congress of Saint Luis was a meeting of liberal groups in 1901 in the state of Saint Luis Potosí to organise actions against the reelection of Porfirio Díaz. The meeting led to the foundation of the Mexican Liberal Party and is seen as a precursor to the Mexican Revolution.

== Background ==
After the reelection of Porfirio Díaz in 1884, 1888, 1892 and 1896, rumor spread that Díaz would abandon the presidency in 1900. However, President Díaz was not willing to abandon the post, therefore he took advantage of the breach between José Yves Limantour and Bernardo Reyes to continue with his political campaign. This way, general Porfirio Díaz ran for president again in the elections of 1900, and was elected once more in a period that would last until 1904.

== Congress ==
To celebrate the anniversary of the Constitution of 1857, 49 liberal clubs from 14 states with 57 delegates gathered between the 5 and 11 February 1901. The announcement of the congress was published by Camilo Arriaga on 31 August 1900. Among the participants were Ricardo Flores Magon and Margarita Ortega.

== Resolutions ==
Of the agreements that were generated during this congress stand out :

- Creation of a liberal party.
- Propagate the liberal principles.
- Combat the influence of the Clergy.
- Obtain justice in the country.
- Ensure the rights of citizens.
- Municipal freedom.

== See also ==
- Porfiriato
