= Acayucan (municipality) =

- Municipality
- Coat of arms

- Location within Veracruz Location within Mexico
- Coordinates: 17°56′32″N 94°54′37″W
- Country: Mexico
- State: Veracruz
- Municipal seat: Acayucan
- Municipality created: 1824
- Town incororpated: June 13, 1848
- City incorporated: September 26, 1910

Government
  - Municipal President: Cuitláhuac Condado Escamilla
  - Federal electoral district: Veracruz's 3rd

Area
  - Total: 724.65 km^{2} (279.79 sq mi)
- Elevation: 100 m (330 ft)

Population (2005)
  - Total: 79,429
  - Density: 109.61/km^{2} (283.89/sq mi)
  - Municipal seat: 49,945
- Time zone: UTC-6 (Zona Centro)
- Postal code: 96000
- Area code: 924
- Demonym: Acayuqueño
- Climate: Aw
- Website: www.acayucan.gob.mx

Acayucan is a municipality in the Mexican state of Veracruz. It is located in the state's southeast, in the Olmeca region. The municipal seat is the city of Acayucan, Veracruz. It covers a total of 724.65 km^{2} (279.79 sq mi).

At the 2005 INEGI Census, the municipality reported a population of 79,459, of whom 49,945 lived in the municipal seat. Of the municipality's population, 3,655 (5.22%) spoke an indigenous language, primarily Popoluca, followed in numbers by Zapotec.

In addition to the seat, the municipality's largest other communities are Corral Nuevo and Dehesa.

== History ==
Conquistadores Gonzalo de Sandoval and Hernan Cortés passed through Acayucan on the route from Tuxtepec to Tenochititlan. In 1580 it was part of the "Villa de Espíritu Santo" (Coatzacoalcos); when this was wiped out by pirates, Ayayucan became the seat of the Alcaldía mayor.

The local indigenous population rose up in rebellion in 1787.

After the Mexican War of Independence in 1821, the Acayucan municipality was established in 1824. San Martin Acayucan became a villa in 1824 and a town on June 13, 1848. The community was destroyed by a hurricane in 1888.

Hilario C. Salas took the town of Acayucan in his fight against the Porfirian dictatorship in 1906. San Martin Acayucan became a city on September 26, 1910.

Electrification came to the city in 1946. The Catholic church was destroyed in the July 1957 earthquake.

In 2005–07, the municipal president (mayor) of Acayucan was Fabiola Vázquez Saút of the PAN, a daughter of the slain cacique (local baron) Cirilo Vázquez.

In May 2020, Francisco Navarette Serna, presumed drug chieftain responsible for the February 2016 murders of five young people from Acayucan between 16 and 27 years old, was killed at a party at the height of the COVID-19 pandemic in Mexico.

== Geography ==
=== Climate ===
Climate data for Acayucan
| Month | Jan | Feb | Mar | Apr | May | Jun | Jul | Aug | Sep | Oct | Nov | Dec | Year |
|---|---|---|---|---|---|---|---|---|---|---|---|---|---|
| Mean daily maximum °C (°F) | 26.7 (80.1) | 27.7 (81.9) | 31.0 (87.8) | 33.4 (92.1) | 34.5 (94.1) | 32.8 (91.0) | 31.2 (88.2) | 31.6 (88.9) | 31.1 (88.0) | 29.7 (85.5) | 28.2 (82.8) | 27.2 (81.0) | 30.4 (86.7) |
| Mean daily minimum °C (°F) | 17.9 (64.2) | 17.7 (63.9) | 19.9 (67.8) | 22.1 (71.8) | 23.5 (74.3) | 23.4 (74.1) | 22.9 (73.2) | 23.2 (73.8) | 23.2 (73.8) | 22.0 (71.6) | 20.3 (68.5) | 18.9 (66.0) | 21.3 (70.3) |
| Average precipitation mm (inches) | 46 (1.8) | 41 (1.6) | 25 (1.0) | 28 (1.1) | 58 (2.3) | 260 (10.1) | 330 (12.9) | 310 (12.2) | 340 (13.5) | 220 (8.5) | 99 (3.9) | 69 (2.7) | 1,820 (71.6) |
Source: Weatherbase
