= Edendale, Los Angeles =

Archaic placename in California

Coordinates: 34.079313°N 118.262692°W

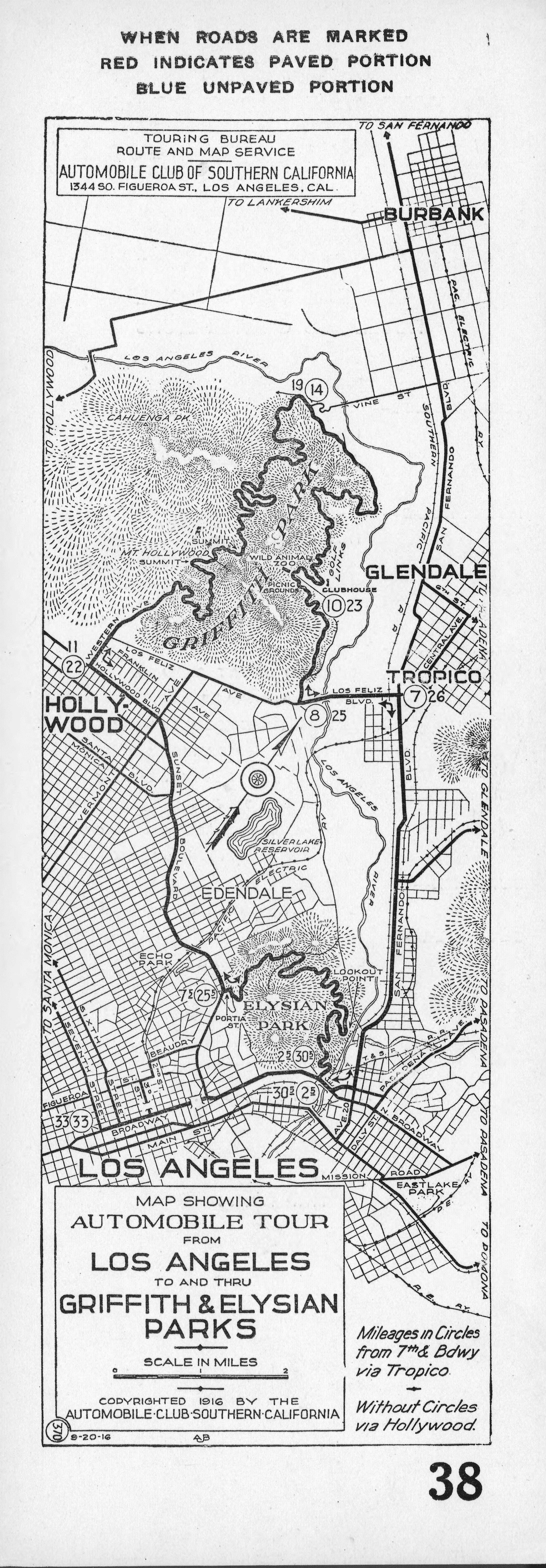
1916 map showing location of Edendale (center)

Edendale is a historical name for a district in Los Angeles, California, northwest of downtown Los Angeles, in what is known today as Echo Park, Los Feliz and Silver Lake. In the opening decades of the 20th century, in the era of silent movies, Edendale was known as the home of most major movie studios on the West Coast. Among its many claims, it was home to the Keystone Cops, and the site of many movie firsts, including Charlie Chaplin's first movie, the first feature-length comedy, and one of the first pies-in-the-face. The Edendale movie studios were mostly concentrated in a four-block stretch of Allesandro Street, between Berkeley Avenue and Duane Street. Allesandro Street was later renamed Glendale Boulevard (and a smaller nearby street took on the name Allesandro).

Edendale's hilly streets and nearby lake lent themselves to many silent movie gags. The district's heyday as the center of the motion picture industry was in the 1910s. By the 1920s, the studios had moved elsewhere, mostly to Hollywood, which would come to supplant it as the "movie capital of the world".

In the years prior to World War II, Edendale had a large artist community and a large communist community. Many of its residents were transplants from the Eastern United States or the Soviet Union.

Edendale was known as such at least until 1940, as the Pacific Electric Railway operated an Edendale Line of its "red cars" that ran the 5-mile (8.0 km) course between Downtown Los Angeles and the top of Edendale. The red car ran down the median of Allesandro Avenue (Glendale Blvd.), which was double-tracked, and even triple-tracked between Sunset and Effie, as the tracks were also used by the interurban Glendale-Burbank Line. After 1940, the Edendale Line as such ceased, though service continued in the form of local service on the Glendale-Burbank Line. Rail service on that line ended completely in 1955, and the tracks have been abandoned. Soon after, the region was cut in two by the construction of the Glendale Freeway.

The name Edendale is no longer used as a place name, and is little known today. A few remnants of the name are the local post office (officially called Edendale Station), a public library branch, an urban farm called Edendale Farm and a restaurant called Edendale. Although many of the structures from the 1910s remain and can be identified by careful comparison with old photos, this district today is located in an unremarkable commercial zone called the "Glendale Boulevard Corridor," which is known mostly for its function as a commuter thoroughfare between the southern end of the Glendale Freeway and downtown Los Angeles. (See vintage and modern site photos.)

== Motion picture industry in Edendale ==
In its July 1911 issue, movie trade publication "Motography" described Edendale thus: "Edendale...is a very beautiful suburb of Los Angeles. It is the motion picture center of the Pacific Coast. With clear air and sunshine three hundred days out of the year, conditions are ideal for perfect picture making. The scenic advantages of the location, too, are unique. From [Edendale] can be seen the Pacific Ocean, twenty-two miles to the west, and the broad panorama of Southern California, with its fruit and stock ranches, its snowcapped mountains and its tropical vegetation, to the east, north and south. Within a short distance of Edendale may be found every known variety of national scenery, seemingly arranged by a master producer expressly for the motion picture camera."

=== Selig-Polyscope studio ===
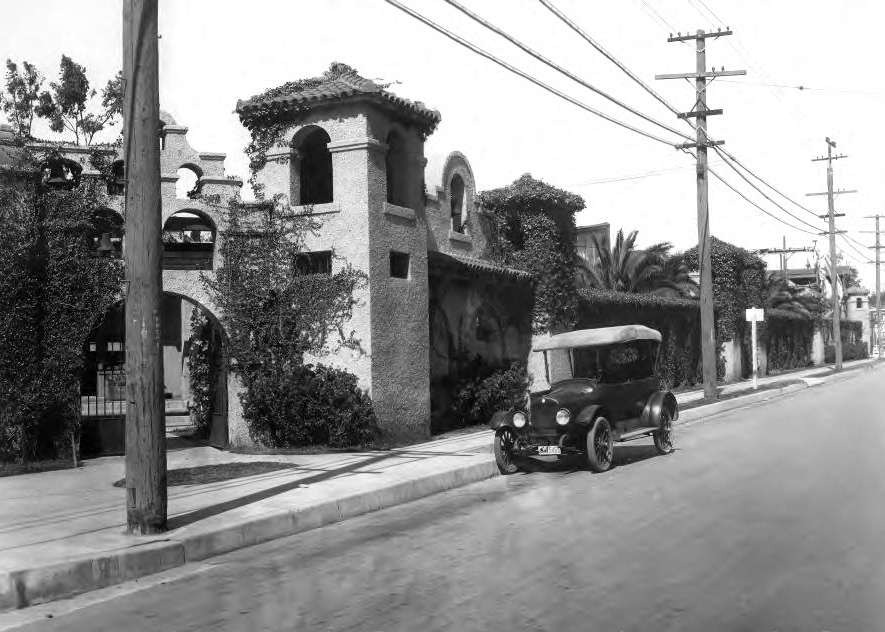
Selig Polyscope Company studio ca. 1910

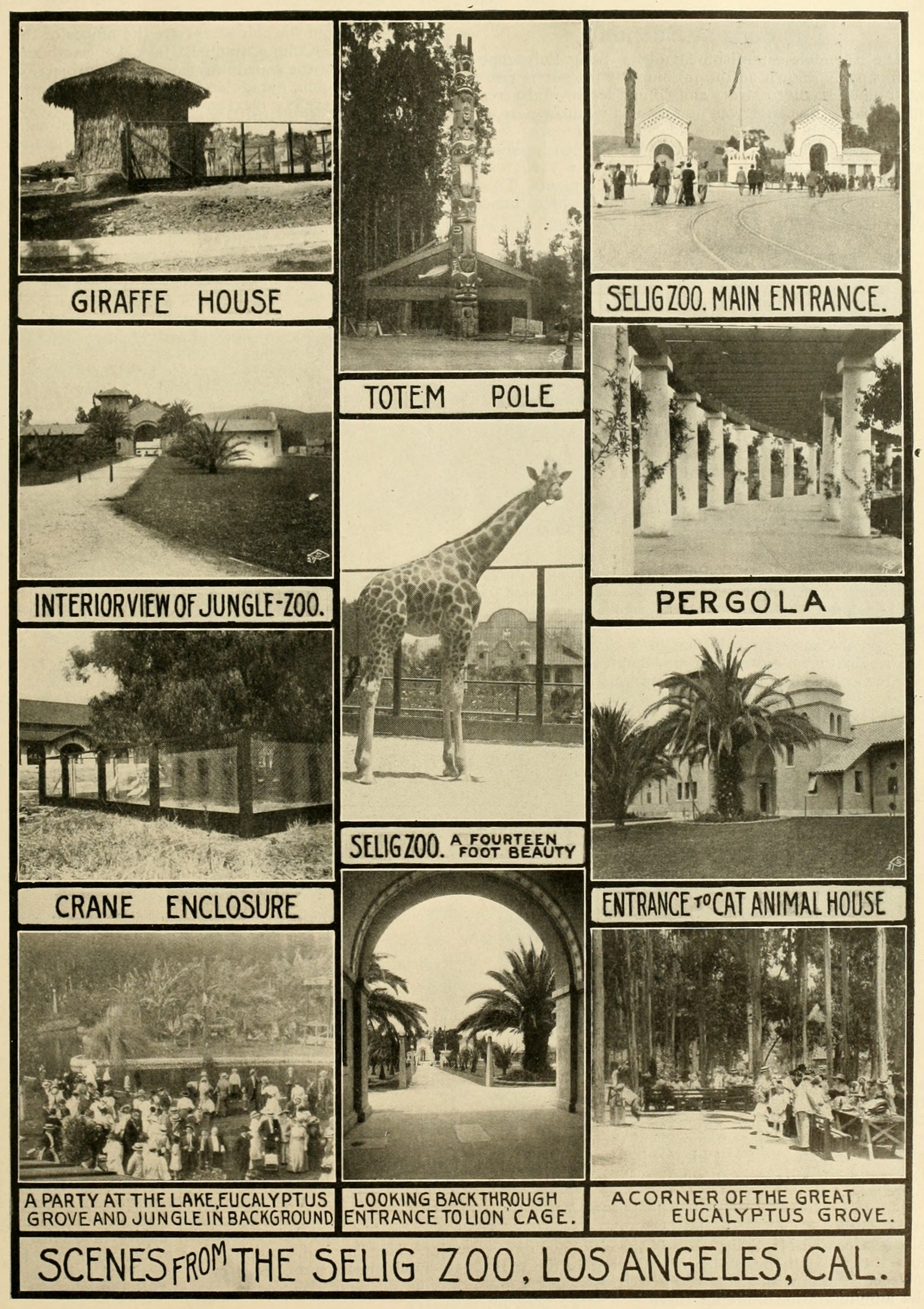
"Scenes from the Selig Zoo," July 1915

In 1909, the Selig-Polyscope Company established the first permanent Los Angeles motion picture studio at the northeast corner of Clifford and Allesandro in Edendale. The company was founded by Colonel William Selig in Chicago, and it was his associate, Francis Boggs who first established the Los Angeles studio in Edendale. Within a few years, Selig had shifted most of his operations to Los Angeles. Cowboy movie star Tom Mix made his first movies with Selig-Polyscope out of their Edendale studio. The studio was originally completed in 1910, and featured a mission-style façade on the front entrance patterned after the bells at Mission San Gabriel. This mission-style entrance set a style that was echoed by other Edendale studios.

In 1913, Selig acquired 32 acres (130,000 m^{2}) of land in Lincoln Heights and began shifting operations to the new location. By 1917, he had leased his Edendale location to William Fox.

=== Bison studio ===
In 1909, Selig-Polyscope was followed into Edendale by the New York Motion Picture Company, making mostly one-reel westerns under the brand name Bison Pictures. The original studio was located at 1719 Allesandro Street, a "tract of land graced only by a four-room bungalow and a barn." Originally under the management of Fred J. Balshofer, the directorial reins were taken over a couple years later by motion picture innovator Thomas H. Ince. Ince made only two or three one-reelers at the Edendale studio. Shortly after arriving in California, Ince acquired a lease on 18,000 acres (7,300 ha) of land in Santa Ynez Canyon, above Santa Monica. He shifted the operations of Bison Pictures to that location, later known as "Inceville".

=== Universal Studio Edendale 1912 ===
On June 8, 1912, the New York Motion Picture Company agreed on merger with the Universal Film Company. In exchange for money and shares of the new company, the owners of the New York Motion Picture Company turned over all of the company's properties to the newly formed Universal Film Company. They also agreed to release the Bison 101 films through the Universal Program. Charles O. Baumann was elected the first president of Universal Film Manufacturing Company, though he was soon replaced by Carl Laemmle after a lawsuit was filed. In 1912 the Universal Film Manufacturing Company founded its first studio in Edendale, called the Universal Edendale plant. During a legal battle between Balshofer and Carl Laemmle, Balshofer refused to supply Bison 101 productions to the Universal Program in spite of the contract. At the end of the Bison lawsuit, Universal won the use of the Bison name. The Universal/Bison Plant was returned to the New York Motion Picture Company at the end of the litigation.

In late 1912, Bison's Edendale lot was bought by Mack Sennett.

=== Mack Sennett and Keystone Studios ===
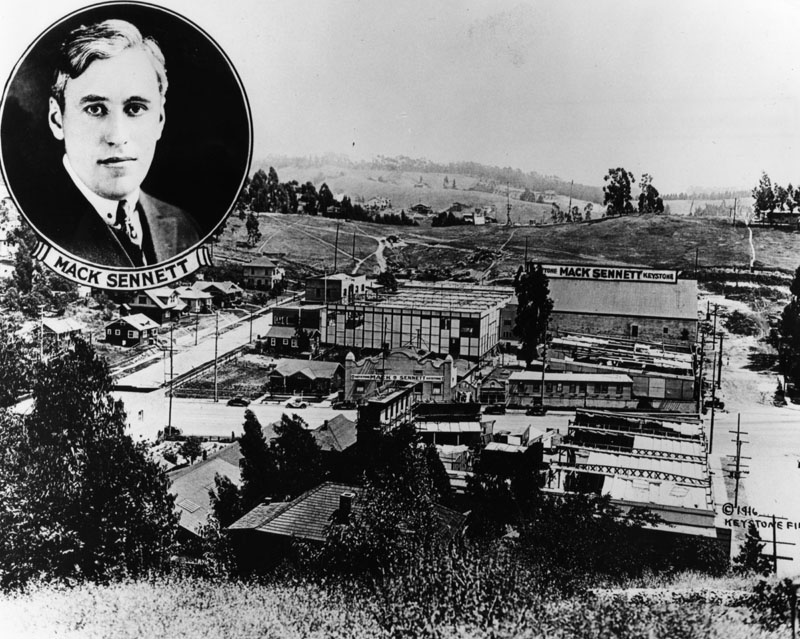
Keystone studios in 1915

After a rough start in New Jersey, movie maker Mack Sennett and his Keystone Comedies arrived in Edendale in September, 1912, and took up the studio lot that had been left by Bison Pictures when they decamped to Inceville. Though he started in Edendale with a run-down and mostly vacant lot, he soon achieved great success, and took up 5 acres (20,000 m^{2}) on both sides of the street within a few years. Between 1913 and 1917, comedy was synonymous with Keystone. There, Mack Sennett was the first important producer and director of screen farce, where speed, irreverence, exaggeration, sight gags, and bam-bam-bam delivery defined comedy. "You had to understand comic motion," Sennett once told an interviewer, whereupon he pushed the interviewer into a swimming pool. "That is comic motion." Sennett was famous for his Keystone Cops, who bumbled all around Echo Park, and his Sennett Bathing Beauties, who included Gloria Swanson and Carole Lombard. Fatty Arbuckle made many movies at Keystone, and Charlie Chaplin was discovered there. His great female lead was Mabel Normand, his sometime girlfriend (who inspired the 1974 Broadway musical Mack & Mabel).

Coy Watson, Jr., who grew up in Edendale in its heyday, recalls:

Life in Edendale was exciting. Sennett needed to produce a 12 to 15 minute long two-reel comedy every week. These were the original slapstick, belly-laugh-a-minute flickers. They made the world laugh as the dignified were made to look ridiculous. The best-dressed folks got hit in the face with the biggest pies. Fat ladies sat down on break-away chairs or fell on the funniest, littlest guy on the set.

Kids watched them shoot the first fast-moving chases with horses and wagons, automobiles, fire engines, bicycles and baby buggies running wild all over Edendale and into Echo Park Lake. The Keystone Cops rode in their police patrol wagon skidding on the soaped streets. Dressed in ill-fitting New York policemen's uniforms, they hit fruit stands, popcorn wagons, telephone poles and chicken coops. They took pratfalls and lifted their knees high as they ran and took corners on one foot, waving their billy clubs over their heads. They were always called to restore law and order to some impossible, funny scene hurriedly created by the wit of Hollywood's comedy gagmen. The director had the story line in mind, but the gags came from everywhere as the shooting progressed. When the crew learned the themes of the story, each one was encouraged to come up with a funny thought or idea that might suggest an additional gag to help the picture get another laugh. Each idea gave birth to another. Those early comedy idea men set the formula for the way movies, radio and television comedy would be written for many years. Edendale became one great big background set for comedy. Early film makers didn't build street sets. To save money, they used the actual stores, shop buildings and neighborhood homes.

A 1917 article in The Moving Picture World described the Keystone Edendale studio thus:

When Keystone got going its rise was rapid. Today [1917] the open air stages of the Keystone Film Company cover 5 acres (20,000 m^{2}). In addition to this are buildings of wood, brick and concrete, housing all the industries to be found in the average city of several thousand population, including a five-story planing mill and restaurant.

Another feature of the Mack Sennett Keystone studios is the big open air plunge, which is electrically heated. When not in use for pictures it is at the disposal of the actors, who may bathe in as they desire. A modern cafeteria is conducted by the company. Here everybody employed at the plant may obtain the best of food at prices considerably lower than are demanded downtown.

In the planing mill is made everything from patrol wagons to the various sections of Swiss-chalet bungalows and skyscrapers. The painters supply the realistic touches, which are given finish by wall paper and designers' department. All kinds of mechanical devices are made in the machine shops, and in the garage the scores of autos used in the Keystone's activities are housed and maintained. Many touches of humor are added to the comedies by the sign painters' staff. The plumbing department provided water and sewerage connections.

Separate buildings are maintained for the general offices, scenario and publicity departments and for other activities allied with the manufacture of motion pictures.

The studios comprise a city within a city, giving employment to more than 1,000 people.

Another feature of the Keystone Studios was the "cyclorama", where a background scene was painted onto a huge rotating cylinder that rotated while actors ran in place, creating the illusion of moving across the landscape.

=== Fox Studios ===
By 1916, Selig, having relocated to Lincoln Park, leased out his original Edendale studio lot to film director William Fox. At the Edendale studios, Fox made films with Theda Bara (including Cleopatra) and Tom Mix (whom Fox also bought out from Selig). His success quickly outgrew the 0.75-acre (3,000 m^{2}) lot, and within a year, he opened Fox Studios on a 15-acre (61,000 m^{2}) lot at Sunset and Western.

After Fox moved on from Edendale, the original Polyscope lot, with its distinctive mission-style entrance, served a series of studios, including Clara Kimball Young and Garson Studios (1920), and Marshall Neilan Studios (1925). In 1930, the lot, then abandoned but with its facade remaining, was the scene of a rape. Within the next year, the site was demolished. The lot has hosted various commercial buildings, most recently BertCo Graphics, but is currently empty. A historical plaque installed on the site in 1954 commemorated Mack Sennett (whose studio was actually two blocks south), but the plaque was removed in September 2007, when the BertCo Graphics building was demolished. A large apartment complex now exists on the site.

=== Mixville ===
Tom Mix, a popular and enduring star of early western films, was famous for trick riding, stunts, and flashy clothes. He started his career with Selig-Polyscope, was taken over by William Fox in 1917, was picked up by FBO (a precursor to RKO) in 1928, and made the jump to "talkies" with Universal in the 1930s. Mix, managing his own films under Fox, acquired a 4-acre (16,000 m^{2}) parcel of land just north of Edendale's main strip, and built a western set there that became known as Mixville. In her memoir The Fabulous Tom Mix, his wife recalls Mixville:

When Tom reigned as William Fox's biggest star in the postwar [World War I] period, he had an even more elaborate organization for the production of his pictures than with Selig. Production activities were carried on at a special studio lot covering 12 acres (49,000 m^{2}) of ground near Edendale, California. This home of Tom's Fox pictures was appropriately called Mixville. Tom was undisputed "King of Mixville," just as he was the king of the screen cowboys.

Many of the interior scenes were made at Mixville. Almost everything pertaining to the Old West could be found tucked away somewhere in this unique settlement. There was a complete frontier town, with a dusty street, hitching rails, a saloon, Jail, bank, doctor's office, surveyor's office, and the simple frame houses typical of the early Western era. Only the signs on the buildings were changed from picture to picture, and some rearrangement of the furnishings.

There was an Indian village with several lodges nestled in a flat piece of land at the rear of the lot. From the range of plaster-of-Paris mountains surrounding the village Tom led many a convincing attack on a tribe of warriors, the whole thing looking real when the picture was screened.

There was a simulated desert, through which Mix wandered on many occasions in search of the "bad man". Although Mix preferred actual locations, Fox executives always held the budget over his head.

Among other things at Mixville there were a ranch house, sans a ceiling, a corral that would hold 100 horses, and a great barnlike structure to hold props, such as saddles, uniforms, guns, and various items of furniture that conformed to the Old West tradition.

Tom Mix's original horse, Old Blue, was buried on the lot, which today is occupied by a couple of banks and shops in an undistinguished commercial strip at the NE corner of Glendale Blvd and Silver Lake Blvd.

=== Norbig Film Company ===
At 1745 Allesandro, on the block between the Selig lot and the Sennett lot, another studio was set up during 1914-1919 by the Norbig Film Company. Norbig was a rental film studio that provided a home for many director/producers who were getting started (a business model that today would be called an "incubator"). Director Hal Roach worked here, making films starring Harold Lloyd as "Lonesome Luke". (Roach was well known in this period, and became more famous in the 1920s with hits including the "Our Gang" / "Little Rascals" series, and would build his own studio in Culver City.) Charlie Chaplin worked here briefly, under the Lone Star Studios moniker, before establishing a studio at 1025 Lillian Way in Hollywood. Other studios that operated here included French & Forman, Bronx, Reaguer Productions, Western Arts, Westwood Productions, and Harry Keaton.

=== Pathé West Coast ===
The Pathé West Coast Film Company had offices at 1807 Allesandro (NW corner of Branden), but it is unknown if any films were made there.

== Edendale commune ==
From November 1914 to June 1916, Edendale was also home to the Edendale commune, founded by Mexican anarcho-communist radicals of the Partido Liberal Mexicano (PLM). After their release from the penitentiary at McNeil Island in 1914 as political prisoners accused of inciting rebellion, criminal libel and violating neutrality laws, Ricardo Flores Magon and his wife, Maria Talavera, her daughter Lucille Norman, his brother Enrique and Enrique's companion Teresa Arteaga and other PLM members and their families settled on five acres of rented farm land near 2325 Ivanhoe Ave, Edendale in Silver Lake. Other members of the PLM, Rivera and Palma moved near by. Later, other anarchists and members of the Industrial Workers of the World settled in nearby shacks. They shared this space with the pre-Hollywood film studio colony. The PLM members lived the communal lives they envisioned for the rest of the world by raising fruit, vegetables and chickens at Edendale that they sold on the streets of Los Angeles and at the Plaza Olvera's open market. With their farming proceeds, they purchased necessary goods such as print supplies to continue publishing Regeneracion, the Mexican anarchist newspaper published by the PLM.

== Sources and related Links ==
- Motion Picture Studios of California - article, written by G.P. von Harleman, originally appeared in the March 10, 1917, issue of The Moving Picture World
- Film History Before 1920 - from filmsite.org
- biography of Col. William Selig - from Academy of Motion Picture Arts & Sciences / Margaret Herrick Library
- Hollywood Heritage archive - story on establishment of the first studio in LA
- Echo Park Historical Society - a history of Edendale
- Edendale restaurant page - from a local restaurant that commemorates the name and displays memorabilia from Edendale's heyday.
- Keystone Studio - Then & Now - a nice collage of vintage photos juxtaposed with present-day photos of the same sites
- Edendale in the Golden Age of Silent Film - a geocache puzzle that involves finding multiple clues in Edendale's history; the page contains a number of vintage photos
- Edendale and Echo Park History - Brief History of Edendale
- Edendale Farm
