= Anarchism in Mexico =

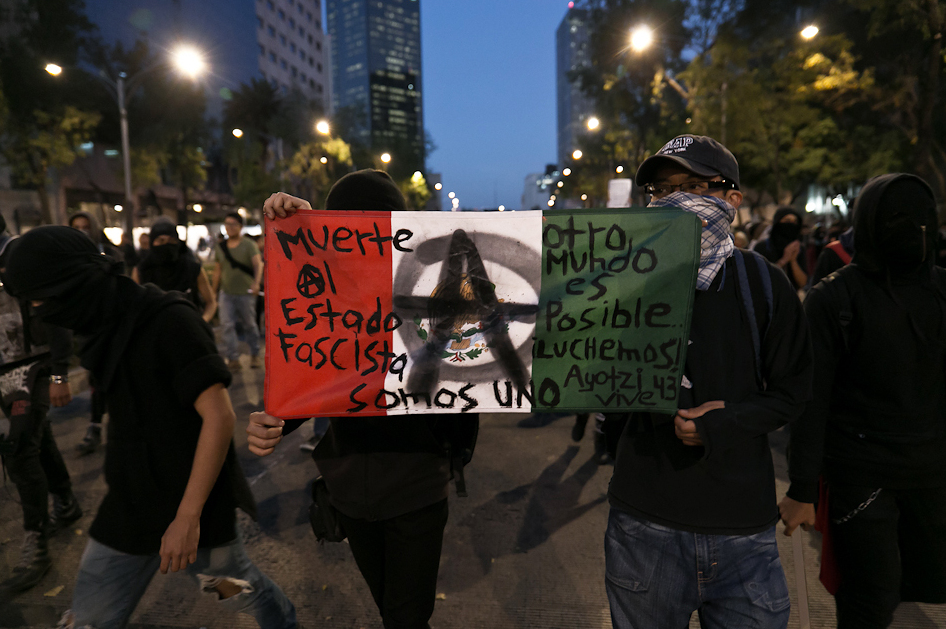
Anarchists in Mexico with a written text on a Mexican flag.

Anarchism in Mexico, the anarchist movement in Mexico, extends from Plotino Rhodakanaty's organization of peasant workers in the 1890s, to Ricardo Flores Magón's activism prior to the Mexican Revolution, to the punk subcultures of the 1990s.

== Origins and early movement ==
The Mexican anarchist movement originated in the mid-19th century, a product of both Mexico's unique historical development and European influences. Utopian ideas and movements went back further. Vasco de Quiroga attempted in the 1530s to create Thomas More's Utopia in two communities, while the priest and senator José María Alpudre tried to start another socialist community of Freemasons in 1825. In 1828, the English socialist Robert Owen requested permission from the Mexican government to start a utopian colony in Texas. Melchor Ocampo, a Mexican radical, while in exile in New Orleans read Charles Fourier and Pierre-Joseph Proudhon and translated a chapter of the latter's Philosophy of Poverty.

The Greek-born philosopher Plotino Rhodakanaty, like the famed anarchist Mikhail Bakunin of aristocratic descent, arrived in Mexico in February 1861 and was the first advocate for anarchist ideas in the country. He had participated in the failed Hungarian Revolution of 1848 and then in Berlin come into contact with Hegel, Fourier, and Proudhon's ideas. Upon arriving in Mexico, he concluded that traditional Mexican peasant villages were already implementing Fourier and Proudhon's ideals. These communities, however, were under threat from hacendados and the government and Rhodakanaty sought to organize them and build a network of socialist agrarian colonies. He wrote the pamphlet Cartilla Socialista, the first socialist publication in Mexico, to gain supporters in this struggle. It argued that humankind was essentially good, but was corrupted by private property, social inequality, and exploitation. He failed to gain adherents for his agrarian colonies. He took on a teaching post and started the Group of Socialist Students (Grupo de Estudiantes Socialistas), which followed Bakunin's teachings. It included Francisco Zalasota and Santiago Villanueva who would be leaders in agrarian and urban labor struggles, respectively. After the 1871 Paris Commune, Rhodakanaty's group turned its focus to urban workers and founding a proletarian anarchist movement. While Rhodakanaty's moral outreach did not reach beyond young artisans and peasants, he inspired Julio López Chávez to lead a peasant rebellion in the late 1860s.

In the mid-19th century, workers' organizations confronted inadequate working conditions. Mutualist groups offered members compensation for unemployment, medical leave, and old age, and focused on providing equal social provisions to workers rather than critiquing capitalism. Separately, anarchist groups, who blamed capitalism and the state for workers' ills, encouraged worker protest, as influenced by the European anarchist movement. Anarchists organized the country's first industrial strikes. Mutualist groups were hesitant to strike, but eventually joined. The strikes, mostly for wages and working conditions, were primarily in textile and mining industries.

== Mexican Revolution ==
Ricardo Flores Magón was the preeminent figure in early 20th-century Mexican anarchism and a progenitor of the 1910 Mexican Revolution. He wrote the newspaper Regeneración with his brother Enrique. Their movement of followers were known as the Magonistas. Likely spurred on to activism by their father and sent to school by their mother, the brothers found themselves arrested during a student led demonstration against the 1892 election. Ricardo while in the student activist group Centro anti-reeleccionista began his political writing as an editor for El Demócrata. After leaving the activism scene to escape government pressure, Ricardo and Enrique returned to found Regeneración on the seventh of August 1900. Through their paper the brothers earned the scorn of the Mexican government and the admiration of many citizens who looked to their radical views as a way out of their situations.

Anselmo L. Figueroa was a Mexican-American anarchist political figure, journalist and member of the Organizing Council of the Mexican Liberal Party (MLP). He was imprisoned in the United States between 1911 and 1914 due to violations of U.S. neutrality laws. He published Regeneración, the official newspaper of the MLP, before and after his imprisonment. At the time of the uprisings, Regeneración generated about US$1,000 per week in subscription fees. Even after covering its publication costs, several hundred dollars per week were made available for MLP revolutionary causes. Smaller sums of money were received from outside donors to the organization. Regeneración was published until 1918. It was distributed in Mexican communities in the United States and used in literacy lessons there, as books were often scarce.

Juana Belén Gutiérrez de Mendoza was an anarchist and feminist activist, typographer, journalist and poet born in San Juan del Río, Durango, Mexico. While many women contributed in the Mexican Revolution 1910–1920 by fighting alongside their husbands, others wrote against the injustices of the Díaz regime. In May 1901, with the help of fellow feminist radicalistic Elisa Acuña Rossetti, she founded an anti-Díaz newspaper called Vésper. She attacked the clergy in Guanajuato and wrote against foreign domination in Mexico. She also wrote against the Díaz regime and criticized Díaz for not carrying out the requests and needs of the people. As a result, her newspaper was confiscated and she was also put in jail several times by Díaz between 1904 and 1920. She established a new newspaper called El Desmonte (1900–1919) and continued her writings. She translated the works of Peter Kropotkin, Mikhail Bakunin, and Pierre-Joseph Proudhon to Spanish. She was also a Caxcan Native from the state of Durango.

== The Mexican Anarchist Federation ==
The Mexican Anarchist Federation (sp: Federación Anarquista Mexicana) was a Mexican anarchist organization that existed from December 28, 1945, until the 1970s. It appeared as the Anarchist Federation of the Center joined with the Anarchist Federation of the Federal District. It published the periodical Regeneración. It received the energy of recent Spanish anarchists who sought refuge in Mexico escaping from Francisco Franco's dictatorship.

Shortly after its establishment it gained the attention of the Mexican police forces and the Mexican government after some Spanish exiled anarchists along with members of the Mexican Anarchist Federation were arrested after trying to rob a truck that carried large amounts of money from a beer industry. Also linked to the Mexican Anarchist Federation was the Libertarian Youth (sp:Juventudes Libertarias) and the publication Tierra y Libertad.

== Present day ==
Formed in 1997, the Popular Indigenous Council of Oaxaca "Ricardo Flores Magón" (CIPO-RFM) is a grassroots organization based on the philosophy of Ricardo Magón.

== Anarcopunk In Mexico ==
Anarco-punk is a subsect of the larger punk scene primarily associated with political activism and anarchist beliefs. Anarcopunk is a well-entrenched part of the punk scene, but their presence has been most heavily felt in Mexico City and Oaxaca in recent years. The political climate in these cities means that protests and political activism have been near-constant, and anarcho-punks have significantly participated in these movements. The most notable of these events was the Oaxaca protests of 2006. During these protests, anarcho-punks made a name for themselves due to their willingness to engage directly with police forces, often becoming the targets of police brutality. Despite their political activism supporting many marginalized groups, these punks still have a tenuous and occasionally contentious relationship with other activists.

== Politics ==
Anarcho-punks are known for being the most politically active and motivated subsect of the punk scene, and these politics are a core part of their identity. The specific politics of any self-identifying anarcho-punk are likely to vary, but they all share common traits. They are profoundly anti-authoritarian and anti-capitalist and view the Mexican government's tactics of control to be particularly repressive. With these antiauthoritarian politics comes a belief in the concept of Autogestión or self-determination. The political activism of the anarcho-punk movement has led them to be significant participants in several activism groups. These groups include Autonomy, Autogestión, Self-Determination Collective (AAA), and the Autonomous Block of Liberationist Resistance (BARL).

== See also ==
- Category:Mexican anarchists
- List of anarchist movements by region
- Emiliano Zapata
- Magonism
- Neozapatismo
- Zapatista Army of National Liberation
