= María Talavera Broussé =

American activist

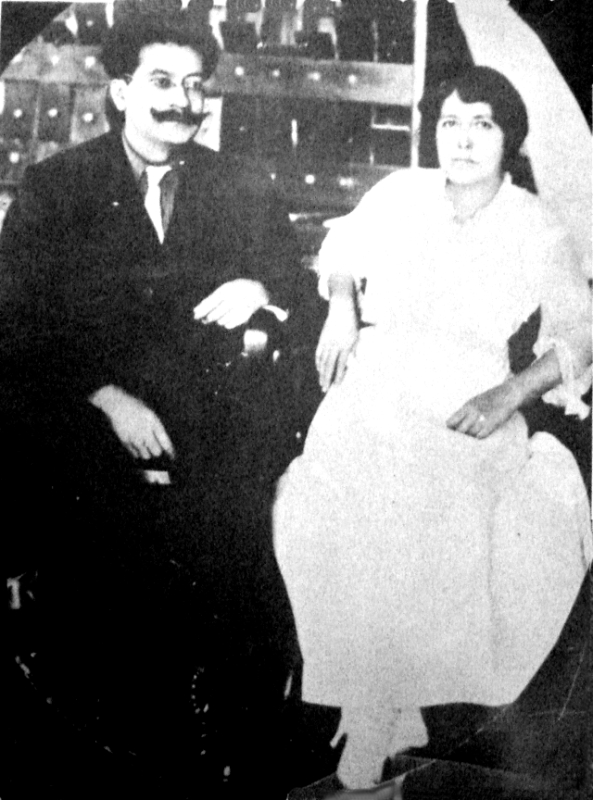
María Talavera Broussé (right) with Ricardo Flores Magón (left)

María Talavera Broussé (1867–1947, also known as María Broussé, María Talavera, or María B. Magón), was a Mexican-born activist who became one of the leaders of the Mexican Liberal Party in the United States. She is known for upholding unity within the party in the United States during gaps when fellow party members Ricardo Flores Magón and brother Enrique Flores Magón were in prison.

== Early life ==
María Talavera Broussé was born in the Mexican state of Zacatecas during the year 1867. Broussé and her family emigrated to the United States during the latter half of the 1800s. While the reasons of movement are unknown, one could associate the timing of this relocation to the dictatorship of President Porfirio Díaz, who served between the years 1877–1911.

Even though Broussé never married, after living in the United States for some time, she gave birth to daughter Lucía Norman. While in Los Angeles, Broussé became affiliated in 1906 with the Club Liberal Reform of Liberty and Justice in Los Angeles. A year after her involvement in this group, Broussé joined the United States-based movement for liberation called the Mexican Liberal Party (Partido Liberal Mexicano; PLM). After working alongside its members and publishing a series of articles via the Mexican Liberal Party's newspaper titled Regeneración, Broussé encountered various instances of persecution by the United States government. Throughout her life, Broussé and her daughter collaborated with the Mexican Liberal Party as members. During Broussé's participation in the party, she became romantically involved with one of its leaders, Ricardo Flores Magón. Their close involvement is seen within the collection of letters entitled María and Revolution, that is what Occupies my Heart: Love and Liberation in the Prison Writings of Ricardo Flores Magón. Following the death of party member and life partner Ricardo Flores Magón, Broussé relocated to the state of Baja California, where she spent her final days.

== Career ==
=== Mexican Liberal Party ===
Broussé's political involvement in the Mexican Liberal Party (Partido Liberal Mexicano) is best summarized through the exchange of letters between her and Ricardo Flores Magón. These letters begin during the year 1908, a year after Broussé's consolidation with the movement. Broussé was known to publish articles and organize events around the opinion of Flores Magón. This is seen in 1908, when Broussé smuggles a letter out of jail from Ricardo, in which he details how to structure a revolt. Despite her attempt to promote this 1908 revolt, the Diaz government of Mexico found out about the plan and soon enough, it was published throughout various Mexican newspapers. Another instance in which Broussé and Flores Magón's correspondence dictates the party's efforts is in the development of the Mexican Liberal Party's (Partido Liberal Mexicano) attempt at a newspaper titled, The Border. Broussé was known to take these articles to Flores Magón while he was in prison, seek his approval, and then return to the party with Ricardo's suggestions. Via Flores Magón's letters, Broussé was also warned about potential threats to the party's cause. This concern manifested itself in the form of spies or infiltrators, whom Ricardo had an intuition about. During various instances, Flores Magón advised Broussé to not disclose the party's plan with a certain individual due to security issues. Above all else, Broussé and Flores Magón utilized their letters as a method through which they could express their sentiments as companions.

== Personal life ==
There is little information on Broussé's relationship with the biological father of her only daughter, Lucía Norman. The only individual with whom Broussé is known to have a long-term relationship with is Ricardo Flores Magón. Despite her prolonged partnership with Flores Magón, Broussé never married as a result of her party's anarchist ideas in which marriage was seen as a patriarchial institution. This type of free relationship was seen as controversial at the time, moreover since Broussé would sign with Ricardo's last name, especially after his death in 1922. Furthermore, the handling of Ricardo's death by Broussé was also controversial for this same reason and Flores Magón's brother, Enrique, expressed his discomfort publicly. Enrique Flores Magón is credited with calling Broussé a "whore" and a "slut" who is merely trying to profit off his brother's legacy. Eventually, during the 1930s, Broussé and Enrique reconciled in order to preserve Ricardo's legacy. Not long after Ricardo's death, Broussé also underwent the loss of her only daughter, Lucía Norman.

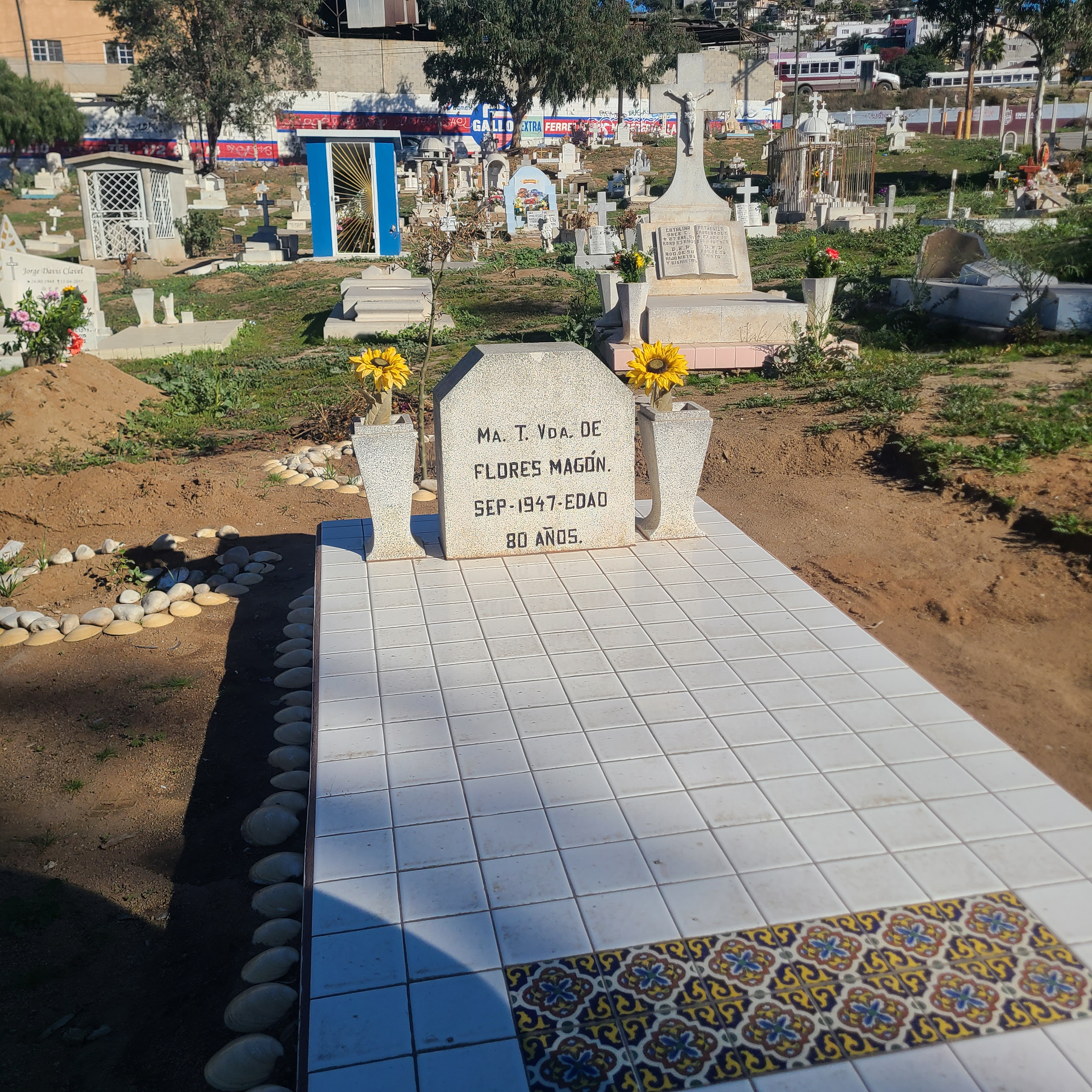
Tomb of María Talavera Broussé in Ensenada, Baja California, June 2024.

== Death and legacy ==
Broussé arrived to Ensenada, Baja California, in April 1939, and died there on 11 September 1947, aged 80 years old. In terms of legacy, via the Regeneración archives, Broussé is remembered as an individual with strong roots in the organization of the party. Moreover, as someone who organized movements or meetings in cases where Ricardo Flores Magón was absent.
