= William C. Owen =

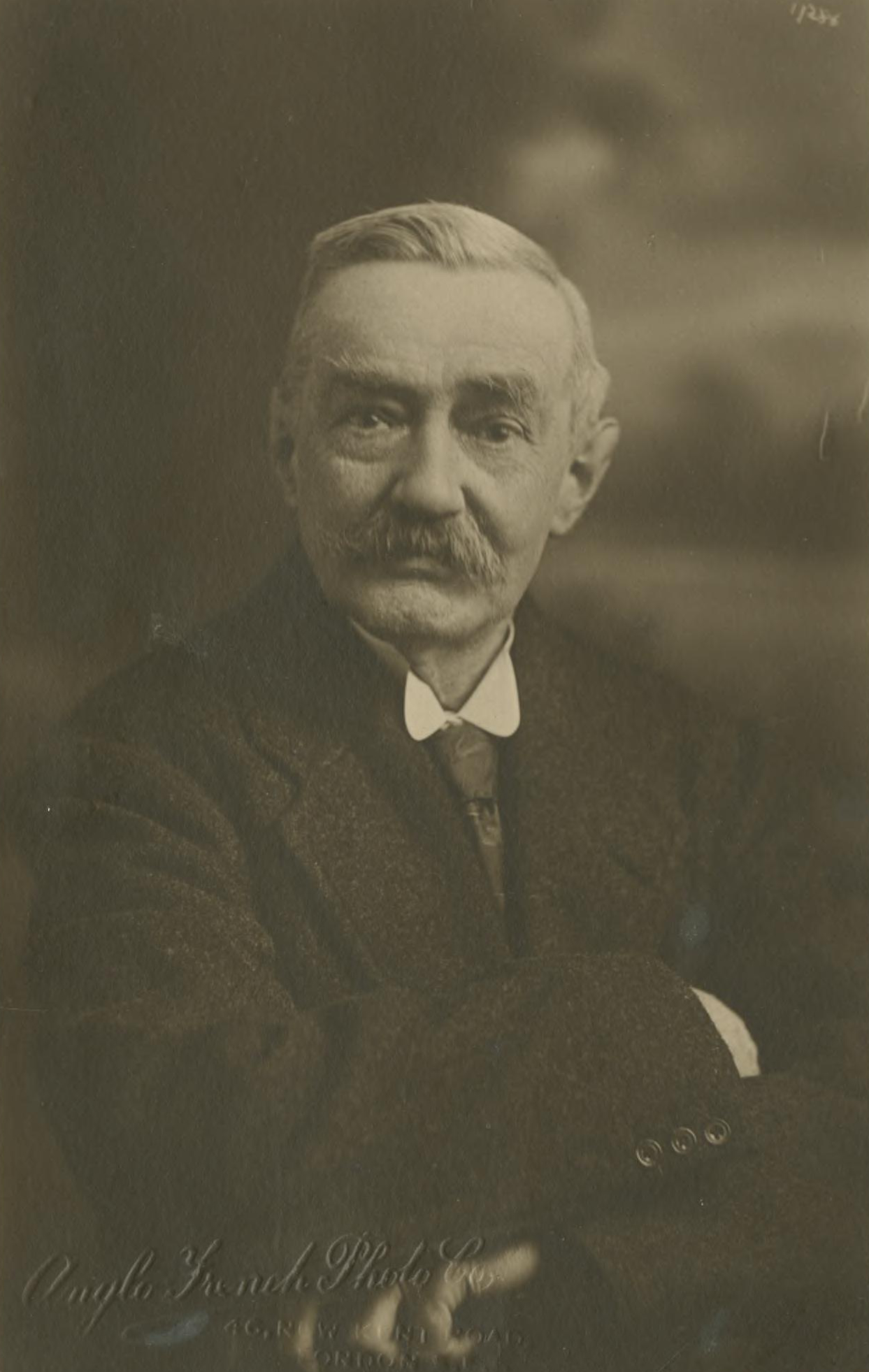
- Born: William Charles Owen; 1854; Danapur, Bengal Presidency, India
- Died: June 9, 1929 (aged 74–75); Worthing, England
- Movement: Anarchist

William Charles Owen (1854–1929) was a British–American anarchist best known for his activism during the Mexican Revolution and English-language translations of Mexican anarchist Ricardo Flores Magón.

== Early life and career ==
William C. Owen was born in Danapur, Bengal Presidency, India to an aristocratic family in 1854 while his family was stationed in India with the British army. He attended school in England, and studied law in London. Upon completion, he moved to the United States in 1884, whereupon he settled and taught in California, among other jobs. Owen became interested in socialism and translated multiple works by anarchist Peter Kropotkin into English. He later met the figure on a visit to England, and their correspondence brought Owen into anarchism. Owen returned to the United States to work in newspapers. He spent two years at the Klondike during its gold rush, which influenced his attitudes towards capitalism and land exploitation. Owen became an activist for anarchist, labor, and prison reform in southern California. He worked as a court reporter and wrote the 1910 Crime and Criminals against the American jails. With the Mexican Revolution in the early 1910s, Owen befriended the Mexican anarchist Ricardo Flores Magón and for six years remained close while Owen edited the English-language section of Magón's anarchist newspaper Regeneración. Owen wrote about the Mexican Revolution for other English-language anarchist journals and published both a pamphlet, The Mexican Revolution (1912), and a newspaper, Land and Liberty (1914–1915). ("Tierra y Libertad" was a slogan of the Magón Mexican Liberal Party.) Owen fought Magón's arrest from 1912 to 1914, but was himself included in a 1916 warrant. With advance notice and faced with deportation, Owen absconded for England, where he supported Kropotkin's call for Allied support in World War I and wrote for the English anarchist periodical Freedom, of which he later became an editor. Owen died in Worthing, England, on June 9, 1929.

== Works ==
- Anarchism versus Socialism (1922)
