= Anselmo L. Figueroa =

Mexican journalist (1861–1915)

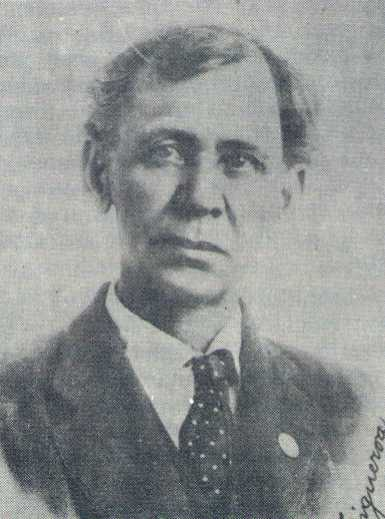
Anselmo L. Figueroa

Anselmo L. Figueroa (April 21, 1861 – June 14, 1915) was a Mexican American anarchist political figure, journalist, and member of the Organizing Council of the Mexican Liberal Party (MLP). He was imprisoned in the United States between 1911 and 1914, due to violations of U.S. neutrality laws. He published Regeneración, the official newspaper of the MLP, before and after his imprisonment.

== Biography ==
In September 1910, Figueroa was put in charge of the publication of Regeneración in Los Angeles, California. The newspaper was in its fourth season as the official publication of the MLP, and its slogan was, "Revolutionary Weekly". He collaborated with Ricardo Flores Magón, Lazaro Gutierrez de Lara, Antonio I. Villarreal and Enrique Flores Magón, who had been released from prison in Arizona in August. Together with Ricardo and Enrique Flores Magón, he signed the Manifesto of the Mexican Liberal Party on September 23, 1911. The document took an openly anarchocommunist stance toward the armed uprisings in Mexico at the time.

At the time of the uprisings, Regeneración generated about US$1,000 per week in subscription fees. Even after covering its publication costs, several hundred dollars were made available for MLP revolutionary causes, per week . Smaller sums of money were received from external donors to the organization.

From June 1911 to January 1914, he was imprisoned with Librado Rivera, Ricardo and Enrique Flores Magón at the McNeil Island Corrections Center in Washington. In a Los Angeles court, they faced charges of violating US neutrality laws related to acts stemming from the Magonista rebellion of 1911. Though MLP forces were defeated in Baja California the year that the men went to prison, MLP uprisings continued through 1914.

Upon leaving prison in 1914, Figueroa and his associates returned to publishing Regeneración. He died on June 14, 1915, after health complications brought about by forced labor in prison. Regeneración was distributed in Mexican communities in the United States and used in literacy lessons there, as books were often scarce. It was published until 1918.

== See also ==
- Magonism
- Anarchism in Mexico
