= Magonism =

Anarcho-communist ideology first described by the revolutionary Flores Magón brothers

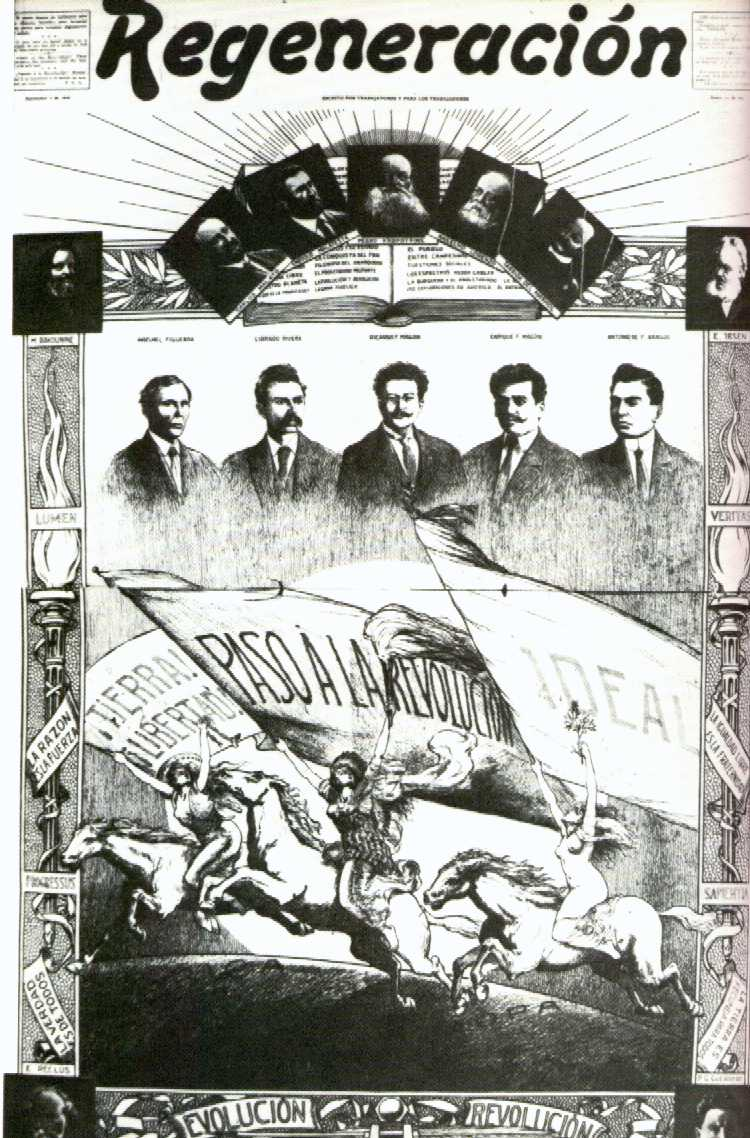
Cover of Regeneración, with portraits of the organizing board of PLM and European anarchists (1910)

Magonism (Spanish: Magonismo) is an anarcho-communist, school of thought precursor of the Mexican Revolution of 1910. It is mainly based on the ideas of Ricardo Flores Magón, his brothers Enrique and Jesús, and also other collaborators of the Mexican newspaper Regeneración (organ of the Mexican Liberal Party), as Práxedis Guerrero, Librado Rivera and Anselmo L. Figueroa.

== Relation to anarchism ==
The Mexican government and the press of the early 20th century called as magonistas people and groups who shared the ideas of the Flores Magón brothers, who inspired the overthrow of the dictatorship of Porfirio Díaz and performed an economic and political revolution. The fight against tyranny encouraged by the Flores Magón contravened official discourse of Porfirian Peace by which the protesters were rated as the Revoltosos Magonistas (i.e. "Magonist rioters") to isolate any social basis and preserve the image of peace and progress imposed by force.

Both of Flores Magón's brothers, like other members of the Mexican Liberal Party (PLM), used the term magonista to refer to the libertarian movement that they promoted. As they felt they were fighting for an ideal and not to elevate a particular group to power, they called themselves "liberals", as they were organized in the PLM, and later "anarchists". Ricardo Flores Magón stated: "Liberal Party members are not magonistas, they are anarchists!" In his book Verdugos y Víctimas ("Executioners and Victims"), one of the characters responds indignantly when he is arrested and judged: "I'm not a magonist, I am an anarchist. An anarchist has no idols.".

Magonist thinking was influenced by anarchist philosophers such as Mikhail Bakunin and Pierre-Joseph Proudhon, and others such as Élisée Reclus, Charles Malato, Errico Malatesta, Anselmo Lorenzo, Emma Goldman, Fernando Tarrida del Mármol and Max Stirner. They were also influenced by the works of Marx, Gorky and Ibsen. However, the most influential works were the ones of Peter Kropotkin The Conquest of Bread and Mutual Aid: A Factor of Evolution, at the same time they were influenced by the Mexican liberal tradition of the 19th century and the self-government system of the indigenous people.

== Magonism and indigenous movement ==
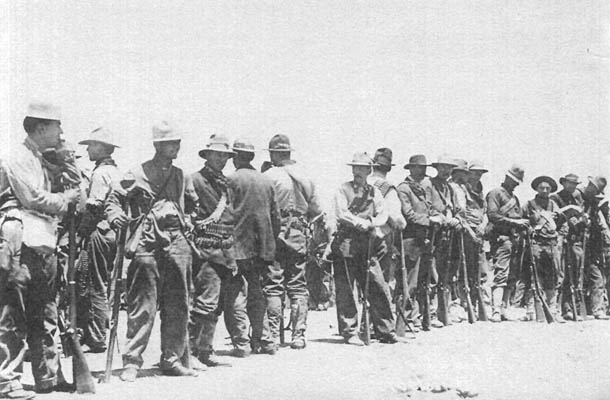
Magonistas in Tijuana in 1911

Indigenous peoples, since the Spanish conquest of Mexico, sought to preserve the practice of direct democracy, decision-making in assembly, rotation of administrative duties, defense of communal property, mutual aid and community use and rational use of natural resources. Those principles were anarchist principles also upheld by the magonists.

Indigenous thought influenced magonism through the teachings of Teodoro Flores, a mestizo Nahua and father of the Flores Magón brothers, as well as the coexistence of other PLM members with indigenous groups during PLM's organizing and insurrection between 1905 and 1910, such as the Popoluca in Veracruz, the Yaqui and Mayo in Sonora, and the Cocopah in Baja California.

Fernando Palomares, a Mayo indigenous, was one of the most active members of the Liberal Party who took part in the Cananea strike and libertarian campaign of 1911 in Mexicali and Tijuana.

== Legacy ==
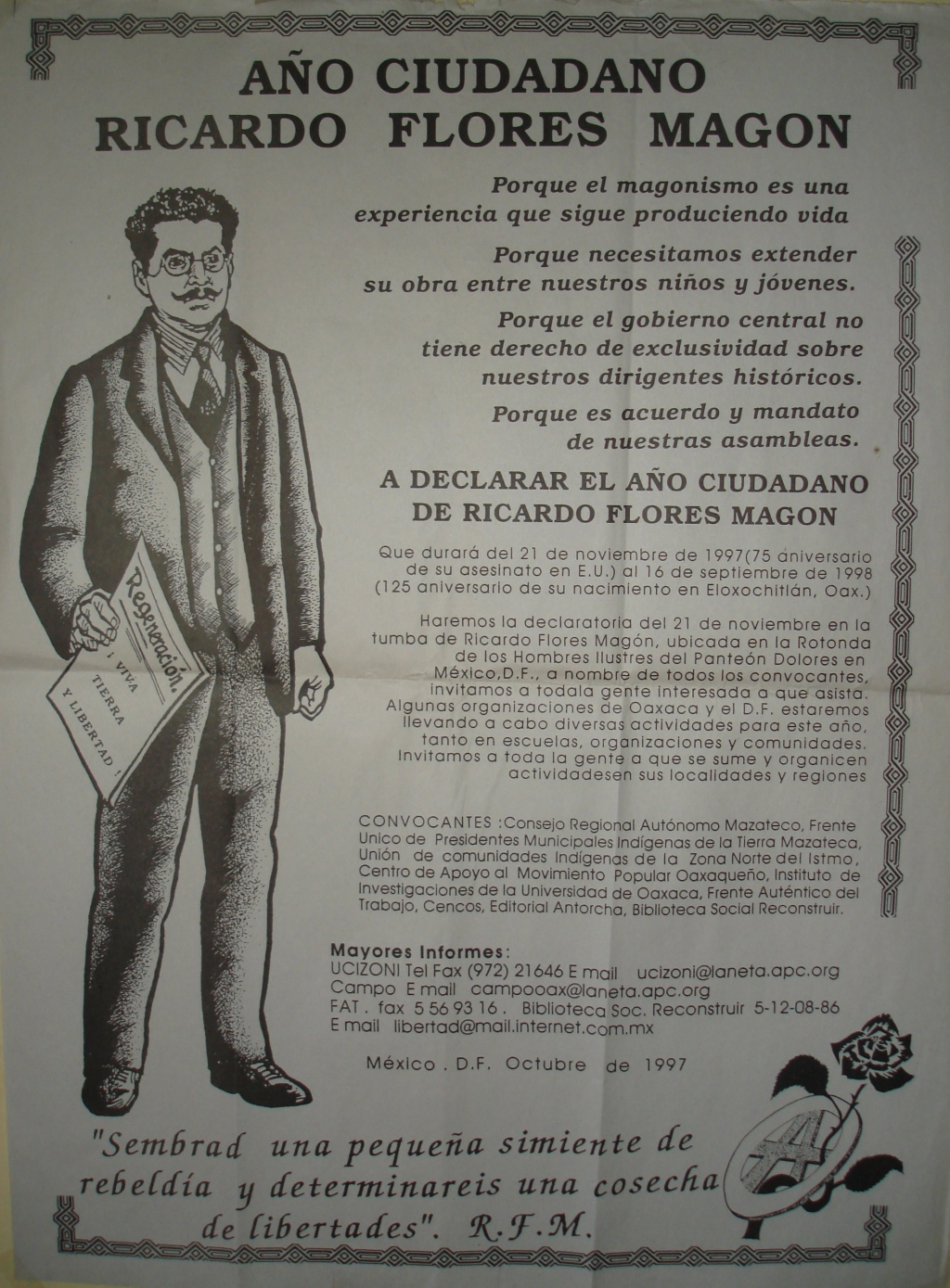
Citizen Year of Ricardo Flores Magón poster (1997)

After the armed phase of Mexican Revolution and the death of Ricardo Flores Magón in 1922, began the rescue of magonist thought, mainly by trade unionists in Mexico and the United States. Mexican governments considered the Flores Magón brothers precursors of the revolution. Both the insurrection of 1910 and the social rights enshrined in the Mexican Constitution of 1917 were due largely to the magonistas, which since 1906 took up arms and drafted an economic and social program.

However, although the demands that led to the revolution in theory were resolved in the Constitution and in the speeches of the revolutionary governments, there was no significant change in the lives of the most vulnerable populations. Also the magonistas goal was not to change the state administrators, but to abolish them. For this reason, surviving magonistas continued to spread anarchist propaganda. Librado Rivera was persecuted and imprisoned during the government of Plutarco Elías Calles and Enrique Flores Magón, who believed that "the Mexican social revolution is not yet over", were safe until the presidency of Lázaro Cárdenas.

The Mexican Anarchist Federation, founded in 1941 and active for about 40 years, edited the newspaper Regeneración and spread Magonist thought.

In the 1980s, Magonism survived among some youth anarcho-punk groups. The Biblioteca Social Reconstruir, founded in 1980 by the Spanish anarchist in exile Ricardo Mestre and located in Mexico City, was a library where to find anarchist literature and works on Ricardo Flores Magón or copies of Regeneración.

In 1994, when the Zapatista Army of National Liberation (EZLN) took up arms in Chiapas, claimed the ideas of the Flores Magón brothers. In 1997, indigenous organizations, social groups of libertarians and municipal councils of the state of Oaxaca, declared the "Citizen Year of Ricardo Flores Magón" from 21 November (1997) to 16 September 1998.

In August 2000, driven by indigenous organizations in the State of Oaxaca and libertarian groups in Mexico City, the Magonistas Days (Jornadas Magonistas) were held to mark 100 years since the founding of the newspaper Regeneración. Some organizations and youth groups taking part in the 2006 popular uprising in Oaxaca were influenced by anarchist magonistas ideals.

== Literature ==
- Rubén Trejo: Magonismo: utopía y revolución, 1910–1913. 2005, Cultura Libre – ISBN 970-9815-00-8
- M. Ballesteros, J. C. Beas, B. Maldonado: Magonismo y Movimiento Indígena en México. 2003, Ce-Acatl AC

== See also ==
- Magonista rebellion of 1911
- Neozapatismo
- Popular Indigenous Council of Oaxaca "Ricardo Flores Magón"
- Mexican Anarchist Federation
- Zapatista Army of National Liberation
- Anarchism in Mexico
- Factions in the Mexican Revolution
