= Acayucan =

- City and municipal seat

- Location in Mexico Acayucan (Mexico)
- Coordinates: 17°56′32″N 94°54′37″W
- Country: Mexico
- State: Veracruz
- Municipality: Acayucan
- Town status: 13 June 1848
- City status: 26 September 1910

Government
  - Federal electoral district: Veracruz's 3rd
- Elevation: 100 m (330 ft)

Population (INEGI2010)
  - Total: 83,817
  - Municipality: 79,429
- Time zone: UTC-6 (Zona Centro)
- Postal code: 96000
- Area code: 924
- Demonym: Acayuqueño
- Climate: Aw
- Website: www.acayucan.gob.mx

Acayucan is a city in the Mexican state of Veracruz, located in the state's southeast, in the Olmeca region. It serves as the municipal seat for the municipality of Acayucan.

In the 2005 INEGI Census, Acayucan reported a population of 49,945.
