= Regeneración =

Mexican anarchist newspaper published from 1900–1918

Regeneration
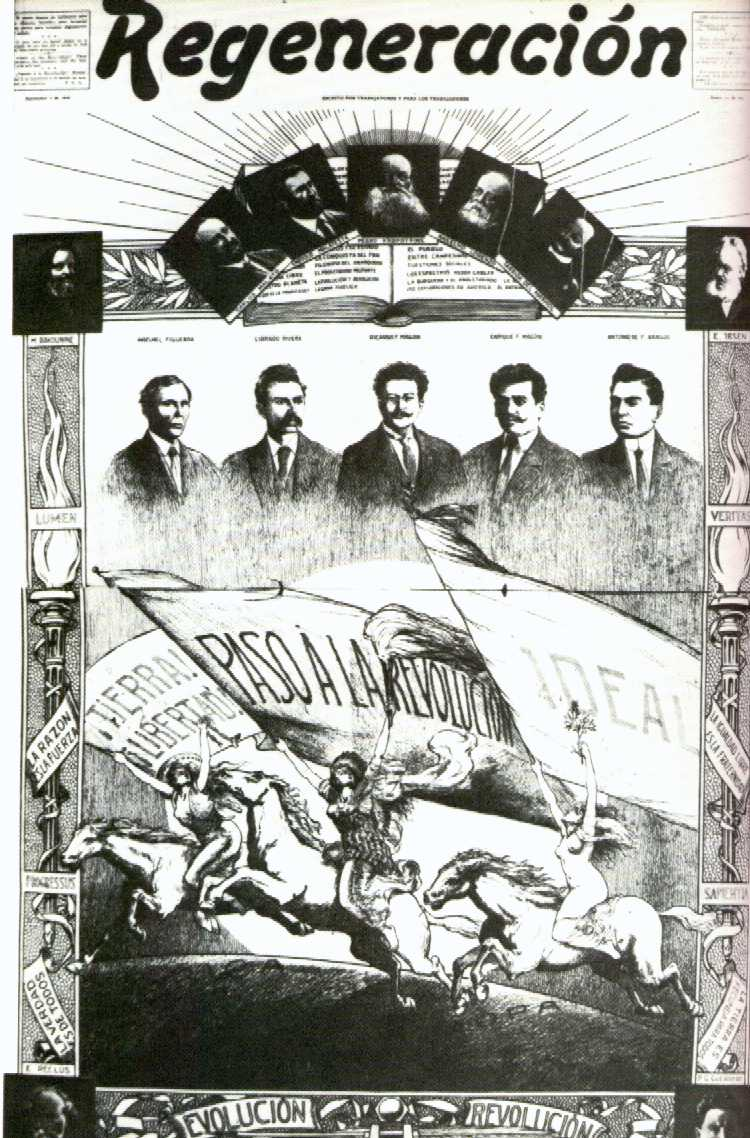
- Cover of the September 3, 1910 edition.
- Native name: Regeneración
- Founder(s): the Flores Magón brothers: Jesús, Ricardo and Enrique
- Founded: August 17, 1900
- Ceased publication: 1918
- Political alignment: Socialism (1900-1911) Anarchism (1911-1918)
- Language: Spanish, with an English section added later

Regeneración (Spanish: [rexeneɾaˈsjon]) was a Mexican socialist and later anarchist newspaper that functioned as the official organ of the Mexican Liberal Party. Founded by the Flores Magón brothers in 1900, it was forced to move to the United States in 1905. Jesús Flores Magón published the paper along with Anselmo Figueroa and colluding with the Workers Party of Acapulco while his brothers Ricardo and Enrique contributed articles. The Spanish edition of Regeneración was edited by Ricardo, and the English version by W. C. Owen and Alfred G. Santleben.

The first era of Regeneración focused on denouncing figures of authority through stories contributed by the newspaper's readership. This era ended due to its criticism on the Diaz administration. The second era witnessed increased cooperation and readership as well as the addition of an English section.

The newspaper managed to reach a wide audience, both inside and outside of Mexican borders, thanks to assistance from militants and supporters. In fact, the newspaper found its way into regions such as Canada and Europe.

Regeneración covered an array of themes including anti-clericalism, anti-authoritarianism, and anti-capitalism.

== Overview ==
It was a major source of reports and analysis on the Mexican Revolution and Spanish-speaking America, sharply critical of the United States and Mexican governments which collaborated in repressing the publication. In 1916, for example, Magón was arrested by the US government on orders of Mexican President Venustiano Carranza for mailing "indecent" material.

In September 1910, Regeneración published the stories of three 1908 revolutionary episodes, in which the Mexican journalist and insurgent leader Práxedis Guerrero described Partido Liberal Mexicano (PLM) attacks on the settlements of Las Vacas (modern-day Ciudad Acuña, Coahuila), Viesca, Coahuila, and Puerto Palomas, Chihuahua, intended to spark a social revolution across Mexico.

Magón's conviction under the Espionage Act of 1917 in August 1918 marked the end of Regeneración.

== History ==
Due to the periods of imprisonment faced by the Magon brothers throughout their careers, Regeneración experienced scattered phases of publication. Its initial phase, following the publication of its first issue on August 17, 1900, only lasted 14 months. Yet, the Magon brothers successfully bolstered the newspaper's popularity in this short time frame by presenting their print as a form of denunciation against figures of authority. Surprisingly, the newspaper managed to keep its audience engaged without the need of reporters. It managed to do so by adapting stories submitted by readers who wanted to denounce bureaucratic misdeeds. Following Diaz's 6th consecutive term, Regeneración changed its approach from one criticizing the justice system of Mexico as a whole to one directly attacking the shortcomings of the Diaz administration. This decision inevitably led to the end of Regeneración's first debut.

The year 1910 marked a new era for Regeneración as it witnessed a surge in cooperation and readership. With the help of figures such as John Kenneth Turner, Antonio Villarreal, and Praxdeis Guerrero, among many others, the newspaper was able to encompass an array of topics that linked to the goals of the Liberal Party. Some examples include descriptions of the prison conditions to which some members of the party were exposed to, such as those of Arizona, or stories of revolutionary martyrs. Around this time, the newspaper also added an English section, a sign that Regeneración and its cause were sparking the interest of American and foreign audiences. Consisting of a page or less of articles, the English section of Regeneración attempted to appeal to its foreign audiences by justifying the Mexican Liberal Party's desire to escape a despotic government and better the condition of Mexico. This can be seen in the issue from September 3, 1910, where one of the articles, entitled "The Platform of the Mexican Liberal Party", states a total of 52 reforms that the party wished to enact in Mexico. These include changes such as reducing the presidential period in office to 4 years, the creation of more primary schools, and the prohibition of child labor until the age of 14. One of the suggested reforms, following in the footsteps of the United States' Chinese Exclusion Act, was to prohibit Chinese immigration into Mexico

=== Dissemination of Regeneración ===
As a publication, Regeneración was an essential tool for the Partido Liberal Mexicano (PLM) to secure a following and financial support. Even with authorities keeping close watch over the organization, members of the PLM were able to disseminate issues of Regeneración across Mexico and the United States. They achieved this with the help of militants and supporters, such as railway workers, who transported the issues to major population hubs. Thanks to this network, issues with over 20,000 copies were successfully delivered to readers of Regeneración. In fact, the PLM's dissemination/propaganda efforts managed to reach Canada, Latin America, and Europe.

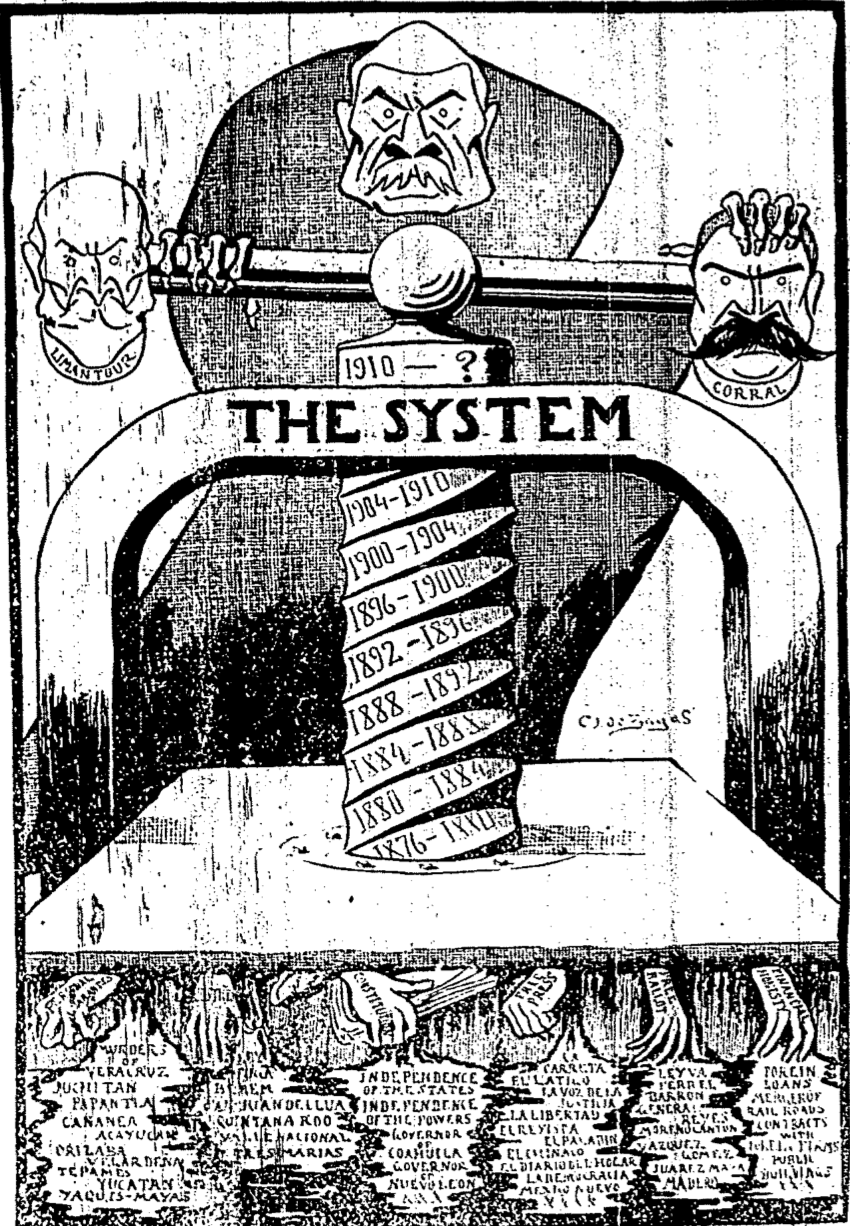
Political cartoon of Mexican president Porfirio Díaz

== Themes ==
As a socialist and then an anarchist newspaper, Regeneración covered a wide range of topics representative of this movement including inclinations that were anti-religious, anti-capitalist, and anti-authority. In a speech at El Monte, California, Richardo Flores Magon went as far as to state that he found these inclinations to embody Mexico's revolutionary history.

=== Socialism and Anarchism ===
Between 1905 and 1911 Regeneración was firmly socialist, but Flores Magón began to reveal his anarchist leanings in February 1911, writing "I am firmly convinced that there is not, and cannot be, a good government. They are all bad. ... Government is tyranny, because it curtails the individual’s free initiative, and the sole purpose it serves is to uphold a social system which is unsuitable for the true development of the human being." Then in September he officially identified himself aligned with the anarchist cause, and helped reconstitute the Partido Liberal Mexicano with a new anarchist manifesto. After that, Regeneración was officially an anarchist newspaper.

=== Anti-clericalism ===
Some articles found within the pages of Regeneración expressed an anti-religious sentiment. For example, in the newspaper's issue for November 29, 1913, the opening article, "La Infamia de Los Dioses" (The Infamy of the Gods), attempts to discredit the stance of the Catholic church by contrasting the institution's supportive attitude towards figures of authority to its disapproval of Mexican revolutionaries. Quoting directly from a Catholic-Mexican newspaper, El Pais, the article argues that while revolutionaries, such as the Zapatistas, are seen as "salvages y bandoleros" (savages and robbers), the atrocities of officials (and their armies) are deemed heroic. Meanwhile, the Catholic church justifies its own actions as "obediencia a un mandato celestial" (obedience to a celestial mandate)

=== Anti-authoritarianism ===
Some of the editions of Regeneración convey the newspaper's inclinations through excerpts and caricatures. This can be seen in the issue of Regeneración from September 10, 1910, which includes an excerpt from the book "Preludios de la lucha" (Preludes of the fight) and a section titled "La Caricatura del Dia" (The Cartoon of the Day). In the excerpt, a man carrying an ax enters the palace of a monarch "manchado de lágrimas y de sangre" (stained with blood and tears). The monarch is bewildered by the presence of this man. He asks the man if he has committed any crimes and if he knows who he is. The man responds that he knows who the monarch is and that while he would be able to live if it weren't for the monarch, the monarch would not be able to live without him. The man then states that his crimes are as much his own as they are the monarch's. The dialogue between the two characters ends with the two figures realizing that their relationship as despot and subordinate makes them inseparable. As a whole, this excerpt conveys a discontent towards despotic governments. The caricature included in this same edition of Regeneración reinforces this theme. The caricature is described as a representation of President Diaz turning the lever on the crusher of despotism. Underneath the crusher are six hands representing, "las Garantias Individuales, la Justicia, la Constitución, la Prensa Libre, el Sufragio, y la Honradez Financiera" (individual guarantees, justice, the constitution, the free press, suffrage, and financial integrity).

== See also ==
- Magonism
- Anarchism in Mexico
- Anarchism in the United States
- Socialism in the United States
- John Creaghe
- List of anarchist periodicals
- Workers Party of Acapulco
- Librado Rivera
