= Ricardo Flores Magón =

Mexican anarchist, social reform activist, and revolutionary (1874–1922)

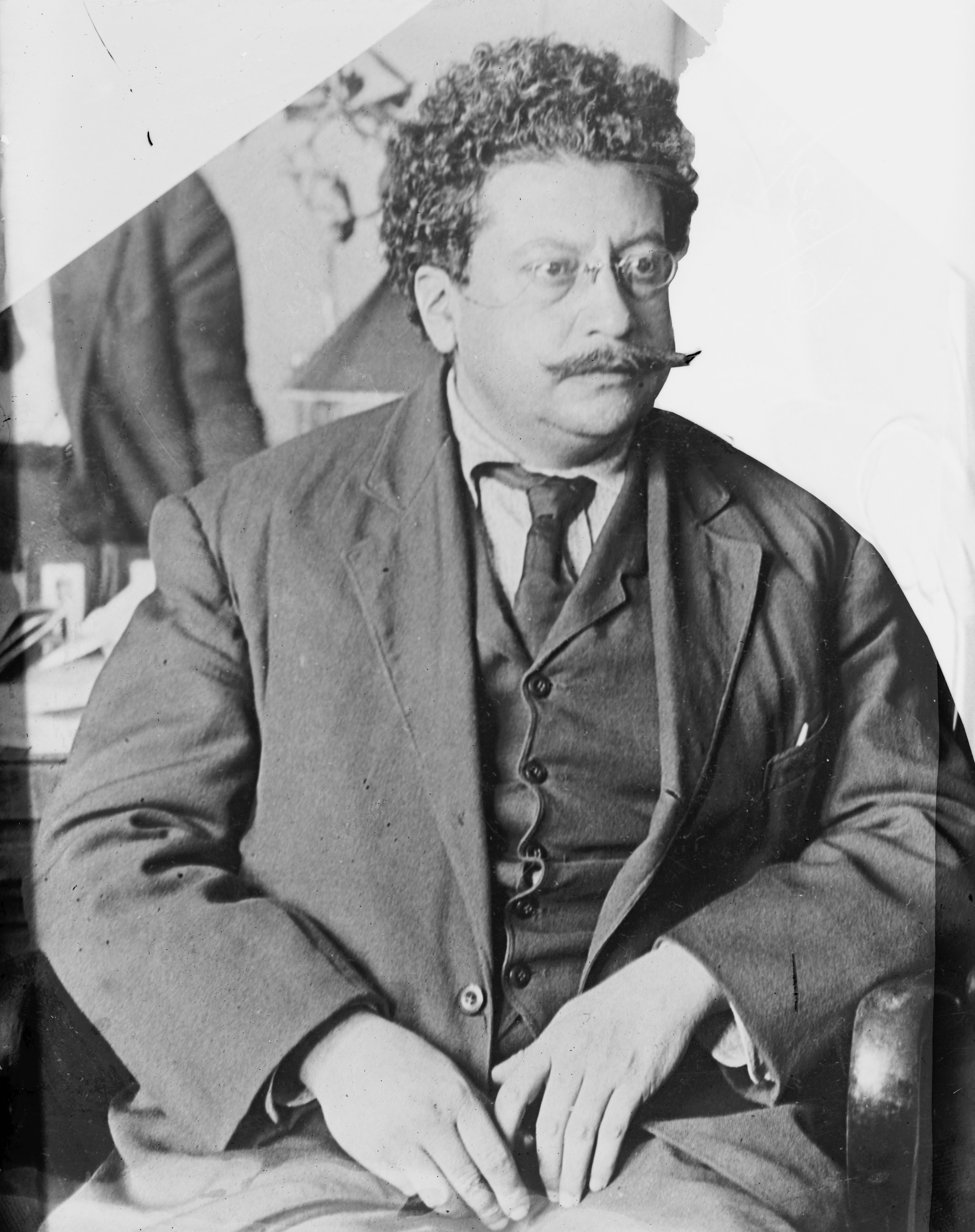
- Born: September 16, 1874; San Antonio Eloxochitlán, Oaxaca, Mexico
- Died: November 21, 1922 (aged 48); USP Leavenworth, Kansas, U.S.
- Resting place: Rotonda de las Personas Ilustres, Panteón de Dolores
- Occupations: Journalist; activist; revolutionary; theorist
- Known for: Involvement in the Mexican Revolution and promoting anarchism in Mexico

Cipriano Ricardo Flores Magón (Spanish: [riˈkaɾðo ˈfloɾes maˈɣon]; known as Ricardo Flores Magón; September 16, 1874 – November 21, 1922) was a Mexican anarchist and social reform activist. His brothers Enrique and Jesús were also active in politics. Followers of the Flores Magón brothers were known as Magonistas. He has been considered an important participant in the social movement that sparked the Mexican Revolution.

== Biography ==
Ricardo Flores Magón was born on 16 September 1874, in San Antonio Eloxochitlán, Oaxaca, an Indigenous Mazatec community. His father, Teodoro Flores, was Zapotec and his mother, Margarita Magón was a Mestiza. The couple met each other in 1863 during the Siege of Puebla when both were carrying munitions to the Mexican troops.

Flores Magón explored the writings and ideas of many early anarchists, such as Mikhail Bakunin and Pierre-Joseph Proudhon, but was also influenced by anarchist contemporaries Élisée Reclus, Charles Malato, Errico Malatesta, Anselmo Lorenzo, Emma Goldman, and Fernando Tarrida del Mármol. He was most influenced by Peter Kropotkin. He also read from the works of Karl Marx and Henrik Ibsen.

He was one of the major thinkers of the Mexican Revolution and the Mexican revolutionary movement in the Partido Liberal Mexicano. Flores Magón organised with the Industrial Workers of the World (IWW) and edited the Mexican anarchist newspaper Regeneración, which aroused the workers against the dictatorship of Porfirio Díaz.

Kropotkin's The Conquest of Bread, which Flores Magón considered a kind of anarchist bible, served as basis for the short-lived revolutionary communes in Baja California during the Magonista Revolt of 1911.

The Flores Magón brothers were from a family of modest means in Oaxaca and all three studied law at the Escuela Nacional de Jurisprudencia (today Faculty of Law of the UNAM). Ricardo initially attended the Escuela Nacional Preparatoria. During this time, he participated in student opposition to President Porfirio Diaz and was jailed for five months. Nevertheless, he graduated and then transferred to the National School of Law. While there, he worked as a proofreader for the student newspaper El Demócrata and narrowly escaped arrest when the entire staff was arrested by the police. He was in hiding for three months but continued his studies and received his law degree in 1895. He passed the examination of the Barra Mexicana-Colegio de Abogados (Mexican Bar and Advocate's College), and practiced law for a short time. He continued to study for a higher degree but was expelled from the school in 1898 because of his political activities. In 1900, he and his brother Jesús founded the newspaper Regeneración in which Ricardo wrote numerous articles attacking Díaz. He also wrote articles for the opposition periodicals Excélsior, La República Mexicana, and El Hijo del Ahuizote. He joined the PLM in 1900. In February 1901, Flores Magón attended the first congress of Liberal Clubs, where he met Librado Rivera, another revolutionary who later became one of the leading figures of the Mexican Liberal Party and the anarchist movement in Mexico as a whole. The congress focused primarily on anti-clericalism and the criticism of the Díaz dictatorship. Open criticisms of the government by Flores Magón, such as calling the government a “den of thieves” soon led to his arrest for “insulting the president”. He was sentenced to twelve months in prison, released in April 1901. Once released, Flores Magón quickly resumed his activism by working in the anti-government/anti-diaz movement, as well as through the satirical weekly paper, El Hijo del Ahuizote. His writings were critical of the government and pushed for rebellion against Díaz's administration, leading to Flores Magón's arrest and a further five months of imprisonment.

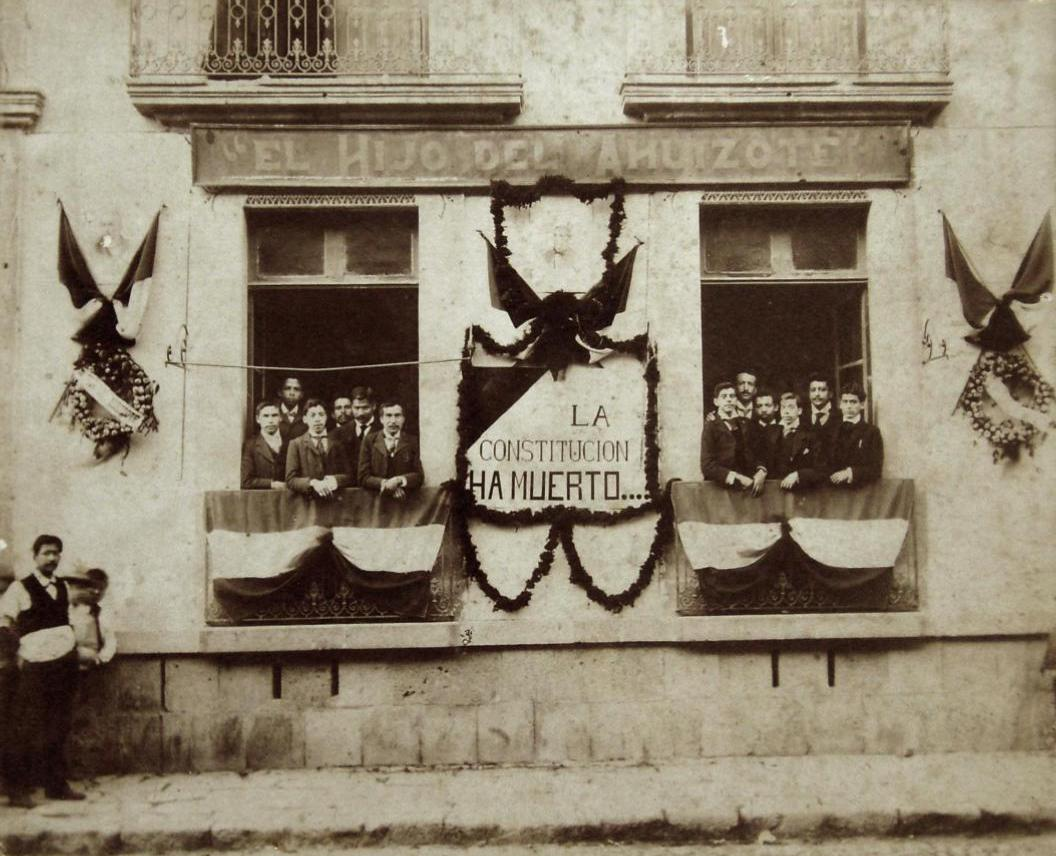
Protest at the offices of the anti-Porfirista newspaper El hijo de El Ahuizote, in 1903.

== Flight to the United States ==
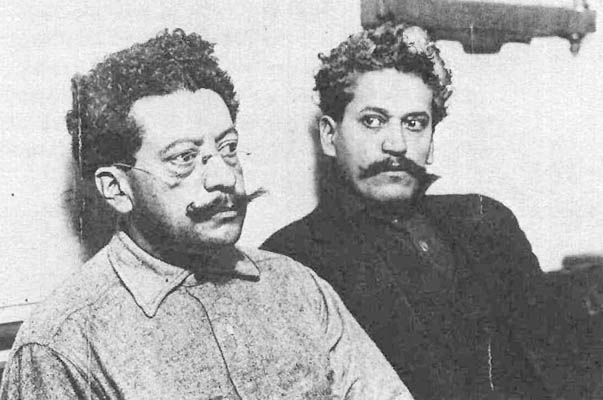
Brothers Ricardo (left) and Enrique Flores Magón (right) at the Los Angeles County Jail, 1917

In 1904, Flores Magón fled Mexico when the courts banned the printing of his writings and he remained in the United States for the remainder of his life. Half this period was spent in prison. He resumed publication of Regeneración and led the Partido Liberal Mexicano (PLM) from abroad. In 1906, he went to California. Around this time PLM uprisings occurred in Mexico which were crushed by the Mexican government. The US sympathized with the Mexican government and started taking PLM leaders in the US into custody. Magón was fearful that he would be caught and be returned to Mexico, where he faced the possibility of execution.

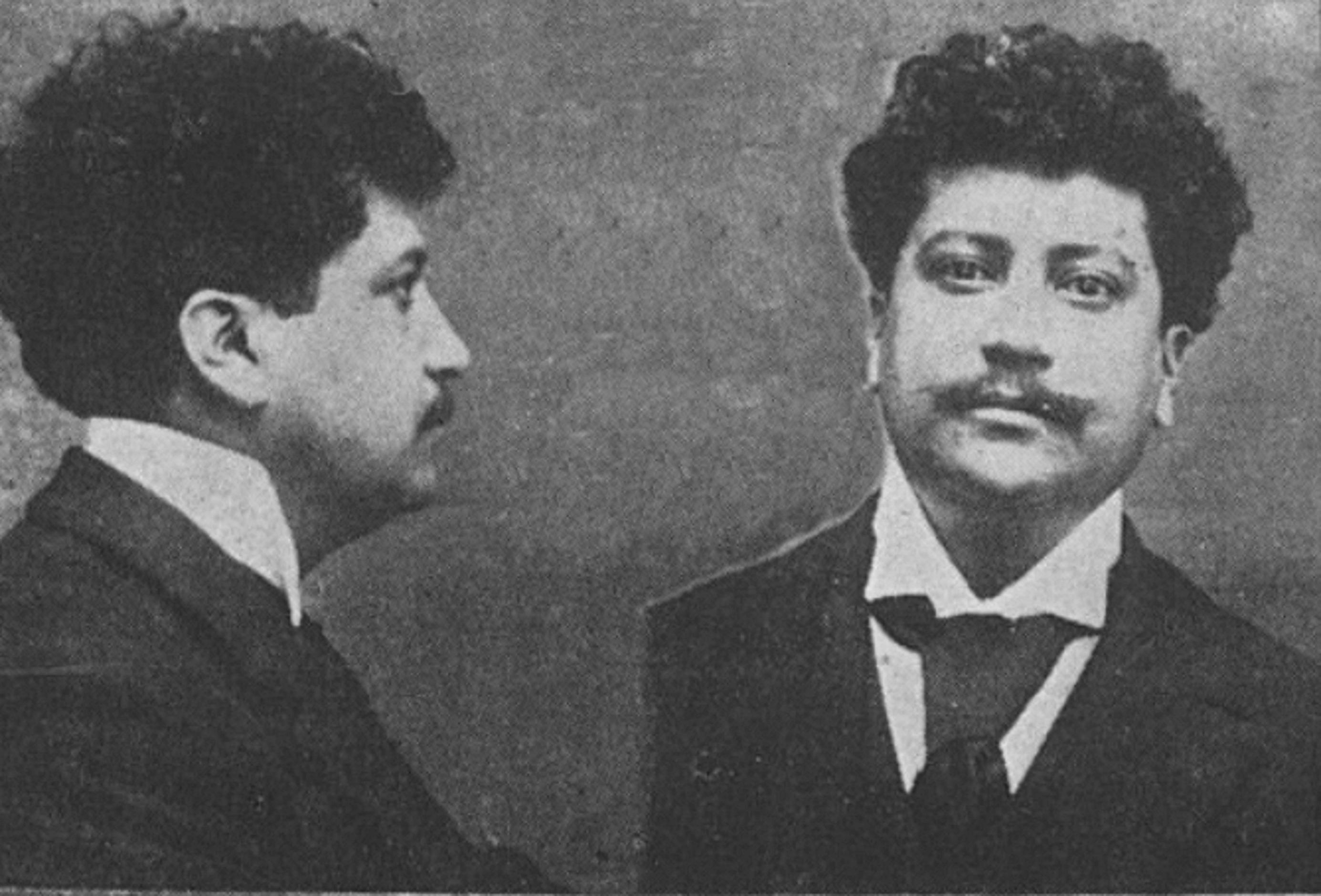
Flores Magón in 1906.

In 1907, an American detective by the name of Thomas Furlong (Note: "Late Chief of the Secret Service of the Missouri Pacific Railway, known as the Gould System; The Allegheny Valley Railway of Pennsylvania and first Chief of Police of Oil City, PA") was employed by Enrique Creel, at that time governor of Chihuahua, to locate Mexican dissidents in the U.S. The American headquarters of the PLM was in St. Louis, Missouri, at that time. There were a large number of expatriates who knew of its whereabouts and as a result, Furlong had no difficulty locating the dissidents in the city. Flores Magón, however, was living in great secrecy in Los Angeles. He used a pseudonym, and only two other persons in the city knew his real identity. If they needed to see him, they did so between midnight and dawn. The dissidents in St. Louis soon became aware that they were being sought by agents working for the Mexican government. Librado Rivera left the city in order to evade capture and although he was constantly on alert for agents who might be shadowing him, he failed to elude them. He was followed to Los Angeles and to Flores Magón's place of residence. Furlong kept the house under surveillance for some time. Finally, on August 23, 1907, Flores Magón, Rivera and Antonio Villarreal were taken into custody by Furlong, two of his assistants and some officers from the Los Angeles police department. Continuing his work, after being arrested in Los Angeles and imprisoned in Arizona, Flores Magón was able to smuggle out "Manifesto to the American People", a list of the goals of the PLM movement as well as the explanations as to why he and others were improvised by U.S. authority, as well as what were “plans for a second uprising and in June 1908 insurrections by PLM groups occurred in the states of Baja California, Coahuila and Chihuahua." While in prison, Flores Magón wrote to his brother as well as Praxedis Guerrero, a fellow anarchist, poet and journalist, about his own views on anarchism and liberalism. This detailed his original intent for calling himself a liberal, stemming from the belief that he and others wouldn't have been listened to if they called themselves anarchists due to the larger public beliefs of anarchists. In practice the actions of the PLM should remain anarchist in theme and practice even if members continue to call themselves liberal, “We should continue to call ourselves liberals during the course of the revolution, and will in reality continue propagating anarchy and executing anarchist acts."

Flores Magón and other PLM members had organized a brigade of revolutionaries in Douglas, Arizona, in the years preceding his move to Los Angeles. An expedition was sent to the Cananea copper mines about thirty miles from the southern border of Arizona with the alleged intention of exterminating all Americans employed in and about the mines. The brigade had been pursued by the Arizona Rangers who put them to flight, capturing a few of them. Flores Magón and his companions were extradited to Tombstone, Arizona, where they were charged with violating U.S. neutrality laws. Although the American and Mexican left rallied to their defense, they were convicted and sentenced to eighteen months in Yuma Territorial Prison, later being transferred to Arizona State Prison Complex – Florence. They were released in 1910 and again resumed publishing Regeneración from an office in downtown Los Angeles. The Mexican Civil War began that same year, and the Magonistas, as the PLM forces were known, were involved in combat throughout Mexico, along with the forces of Pancho Villa, Emiliano Zapata and Venustiano Carranza and Francisco I. Madero. In late 1910, the Mexican Revolution began to take off with the leadership of Francisco I. Madero, a landowner with whom Flores Magón disagreed. Even with the revolution against the dictator whom Magon wanted out of government, he continually spoke out against Madero and his beliefs: “Do not expect then, that Madero will attack the right of property in favor of the proletariat. Open your eyes. Remember a phrase, simple and true and as truth indestructible, the emancipation of the workers must be the work of the workers themselves.” Overall, Flores Magón rejected the notion of a purely political revolution, believing in having a full “social revolution" in order to return freedom and power to the working citizen.

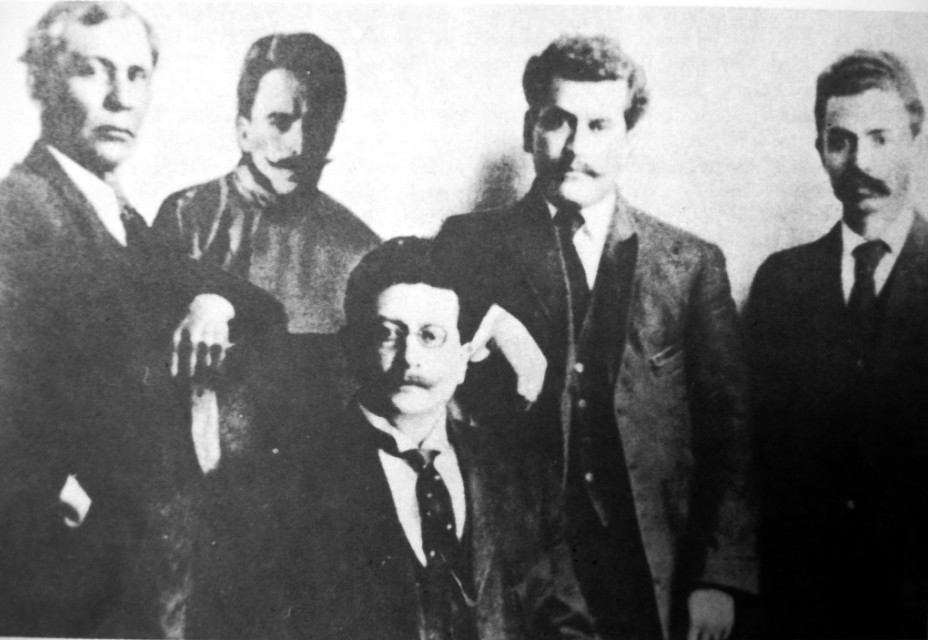
Organizing Board of the Mexican Liberal Party in 1910. Anselmo L. Figueroa, Práxedis G. Guerrero, Ricardo Flores Magón, Enrique Flores Magón and Librado Rivera.

By May 1911, Díaz was defeated. Flores Magón continued to oppose the vast American economic presence in Mexico and Madero's continuing expropriation of peasant lands. He was arrested again. After two years in prison in Washington state, he was released and settled with his brother Enrique in Edendale, just north of the Silver Lake Reservoir. The PLM had no funds by this time, and the brothers and their friends farmed and raised chickens on the rented plot of land. He continued publishing Regeneración and making speeches in the region. One of the places Flores Magón stayed was in the city of El Monte, part of the San Gabriel Valley in Los Angeles County. During his time in El Monte, Flores Magón wrote letters to comrades in Mexico, as well as being involved in local anarchist activities, while supporting himself and his family by picking up work in local ranches in the area. He was again arrested in 1916, accused of sending "indecent materials" through the U.S. Mail. With the help of Emma Goldman, he made bail. Following his potential imprisonment, a new leader had come to power in Mexico by the name of Venustiano Carranza, a powerful land owner and revolutionary who had come to power after Madero has been assassinated. Having the funds, Regeneracion would be able to be published again. In the following publications, Flores Magón wrote “scathing articles criticizing the Carranza regime.” Specifically, he criticized Carranza's use of the “Red Battalions," urban workers who were set out to fight the Zapatistas specifically.

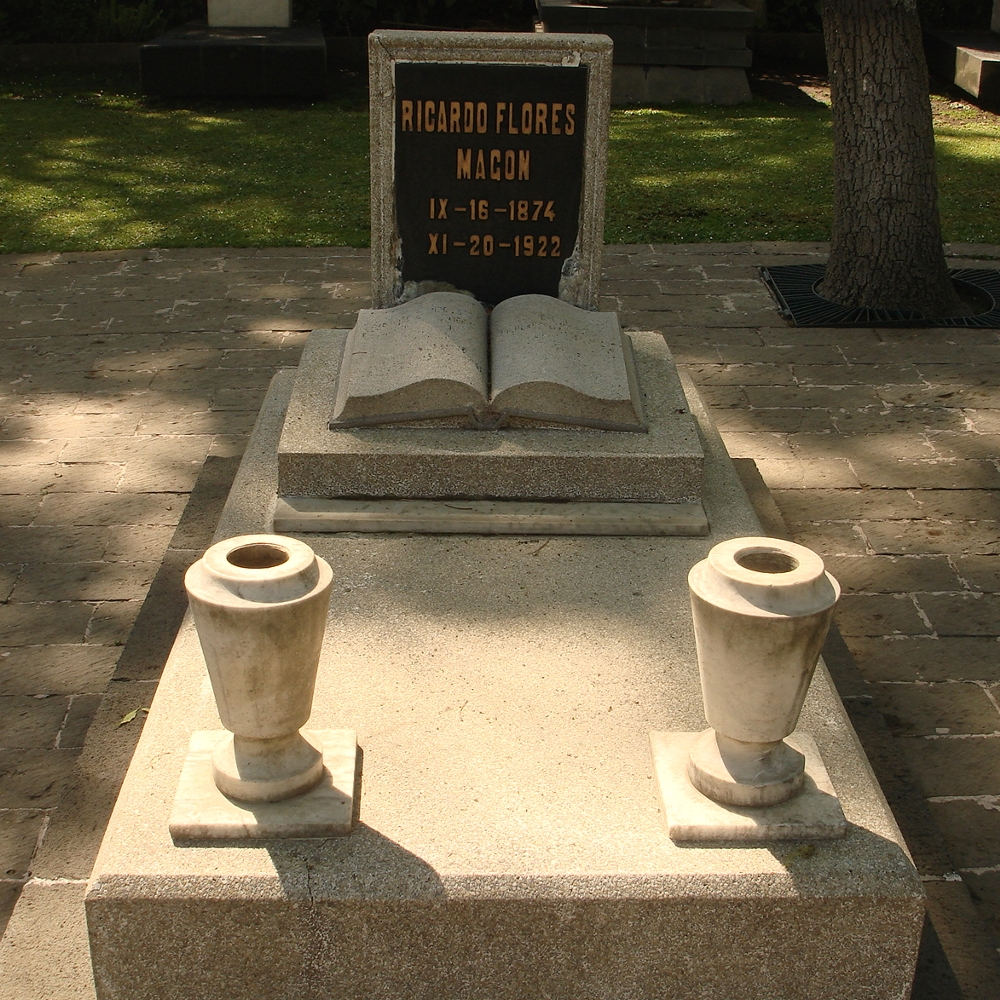
Tomb of Ricardo Flores Magón in the Rotonda of Illustrious Persons, Mexico City.

In 1918, he published an anti-war manifesto. In this he wrote, "The death of the old order is at hand. It is being whispered in the bars, theatres, streetcars and homes, especially in our homes, the homes of those at the bottom." For these writings, he was charged with sedition under the Espionage Act of 1917, convicted and sentenced to twenty years for "obstructing the war effort", a violation of the Espionage Act of 1917. The Wilson administration conducted what were called the Palmer Raids, a wholesale crackdown on war dissidents and leftists that also swept up notable socialists such as Eugene V. Debs. In November 1922, Flores Magón died at Leavenworth Penitentiary in Kansas. He had been suffering from diabetes for many years and was losing his eyesight by the time of his death. He had earlier predicted his impending demise in a letter to a friend:

One fine day, my weapon—my pen—the only weapon I have ever wielded; the weapon that landed me here; the weapon that accompanied me through the infernos of a thirty years' struggle for what is beautiful, will be then as useless as a broken sword.

The exact cause of Flores Magón's death has been disputed. Some believe he was deliberately murdered by prison guards. Others contend that he died as a result of deteriorating health caused by his long imprisonment, possibly exacerbated by medical neglect by Leavenworth Penitentiary officials and staff. Flores Magón wrote several letters to friends complaining of debilitating health problems and of what he perceived to be purposeful neglect by the prison staff.

The Mexican Chamber of Deputies adopted a resolution requesting the repatriation of Magón's body. It stated:

The undersigned Deputies, animated by the desire of rendering posthumous homage to the grand Mexican revolutionary, Ricardo Flores Magón, martyr and apostle of libertarian ideas, who has just died poor and blind in the cell of a Yankee prison, propose that this honorable Assembly pass the following resolution: That there be brought to rest in the soil of his native land, at the expense of the Mexican Government, the mortal remains of Ricardo Flores Magón. We request that this be acted upon immediately without reference to committee. (Signed) Julian S. Gonzalez, Antonio G. Rivera, E. Baron Obregon, J. M. Alvarez Del Castillo, A. Diaz So'ro Y Gama, and others

— Hall of the Mexican Congress, Mexico, D.F., November 22, 1922

The U.S. authorities denied the request and Flores Magón was buried in Los Angeles. His remains were finally repatriated in 1945 and interred at the Rotunda of Illustrious Persons in Mexico City.

== Legacy ==
Flores Magón's movement fired the imagination of both American and Mexican anarchists. In 1945, his remains were repatriated to Mexico and were interred in the Rotonda de los Hombres Ilustres in Mexico City. In Mexico, the Flores Magón brothers are considered left-wing political icons nearly as notable as Emiliano Zapata; numerous streets, public schools, towns and neighborhoods are named after them. This includes Ricardo Flores Magón metro station in Mexico City, and the municipalities of Teotitlán de Flores Magón and Eloxochitlán de Flores Magón in Oaxaca. His ideas have also inspired indigenous leaders from Oaxaca, including the Chatino leader Tomás Cruz Lorenzo.

In 1991, Douglas Day published The Prison Notebooks of Ricardo Flores Magón, a fictional diary covering Flores Magon's life from his birth in Oaxaca until his mysterious death in his cell at Leavenworth.

In 1997, an organization of indigenous peoples in the state of Oaxaca formed the Ricardo Flores Magón Popular Indigenous Council of Oaxaca (Consejo Indígena Popular de Oaxaca "Ricardo Flores Magón", or CIPO-RFM), based on the philosophy of Flores Magón.

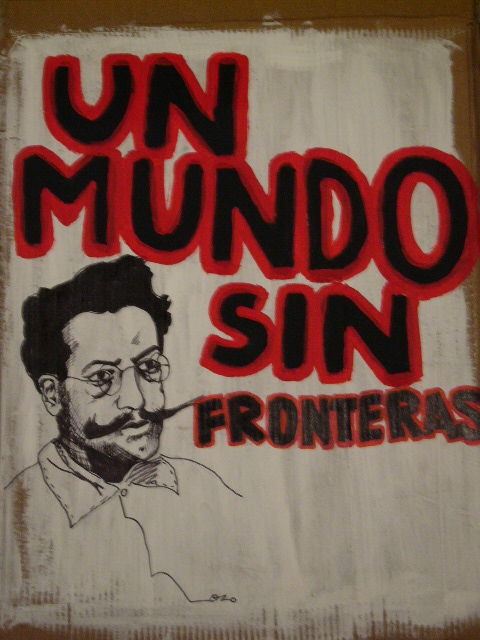
"A world without borders", displayed in New York in 2006

== Playwright ==
In his work of popular education, Ricardo Flores Magón also used the theater to denounce the faults of society and outline the main lines of the libertarian "program". He is the author of two plays: Verdugos et victimas and Tierra y Libertad. He is also the author of numerous tales, published in the newspaper Regeneración.

== See also ==
- Magonism
- Magonista rebellion of 1911
- Popular Indigenous Council of Oaxaca "Ricardo Flores Magón"
- Liberalism in Mexico
- Anarchism in Mexico
- William C. Owen, an anarchist editor who worked with Ricardo Flores Magón
- María Talavera Broussé
