= Antonio Villarreal =

Mexican politician (1877–1944)

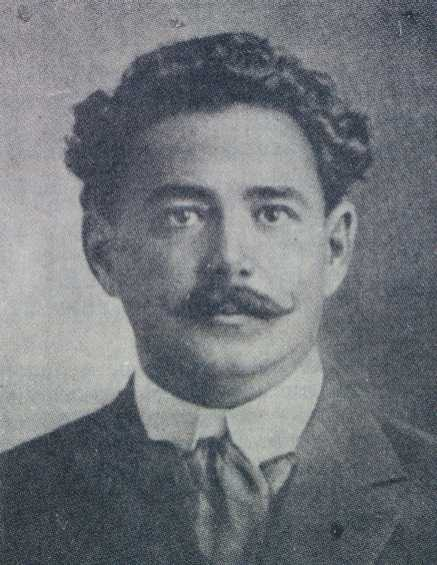

2nd Secretary of Agriculture and Development
- In office 1 June 1920 – 21 April 1922
- President: Adolfo de la Huerta (1920); Álvaro Obregón (1920-1922)
- Preceded by: Pastor Rouaix
- Succeeded by: Ramón P. de Negri

41st Governor of Nuevo León
- In office 5 December 1914 – 5 January 1915
- President: Venustiano Carranza
- Preceded by: Antonio de la Paz Guerra
- Succeeded by: Rafael Cepeda de la Fuente
- In office 24 April 1914 – 1 October 1914
- Preceded by: Leobardo Chapa
- Succeeded by: Antonio de la Paz Guerra

Personal details
- Born: Antonio Irineo Villarreal González; 16 July 1877 Lampazos, Nuevo León, Mexico
- Died: 16 December 1944 (aged 67) Mexico City, Mexico
- Party: Mexican Liberal Party

Military service
- Branch/service: Constitutional Army
- Years of service: 1913–1920
- Rank: General
- Battles/wars: Mexican Revolution

Antonio Irineo Villarreal González (16 July 1877 – 16 December 1944) was a Mexican journalist, politician and revolutionary. A socialist member of the Mexican Liberal Party, he agitated against the Porfiriato from exile in the United States. He was arrested while organizing cells for an uprising against the regime, but briefly managed to escape, before again being arrested and imprisoned for violating the Neutrality Act. At the outbreak of the Mexican Revolution, he left the PLM and returned to Mexico to support Francisco I. Madero, then went on to fight in the Constitutional Army against Victoriano Huerta. During the revolution, he became Governor of Nuevo León, his home state. After the revolution, he was appointed as Secretary of Agriculture by the government of Álvaro Obregón.

== Biography ==
=== Revolutionary activism ===
In 1901, Villarreal had a literary dispute with another man that escalated into a duel; Villarreal won the duel and killed him. Although duels were not usually prosecuted by the Porfirio Díaz regime, as he was a member of the dissident Mexican Liberal Party (PLM) who had publicly denounced Díaz, Villarreal was prosecuted for murder and sentenced to four years in prison. After he was released, in February 1905, he and his family fled over the border and moved to St. Louis, where they joined other exiled Liberal Party members. His father sold newspapers to fund the party, while his sisters Andrea and Teresa became political agitators. Villarreal himself wrote article's for Magón's paper Regeneración and spent much of his free time going out and meeting women. He helped to publish weekly issues of the paper, which gained a large circulation of 20,000 subscribers. The editorial staff soon reestablished the PLM, with Villarreal as its secretary, with the aim of overthrowing Díaz and re-establishing democracy in Mexico.

Villarreal and Manuel Sarabia then left St. Louis for the Mexico–United States border, where they planned to recruit new members into the PLM and organize its revolutionary foco cells. They found the cells to be a mess, with their members often lacking money and food. When the PLM programme was published on 1 July 1906, Villarreal distributed copies of it throughout northern Mexico. On 2 September 1906, Villarreal, Sarabia and Magón held a meeting in El Paso, where they laid out plans for a raid against Ciudad Juárez. An agent who had infiltrated the meeting reported it to the US authorities, which launched a crackdown on PLM activities. Villarreal's family in St. Louis was put under surveillance. On 19 October, Sarabia was captured while attempting to begin the planned raid on Ciudad Juárez. He had possessed a list of PLM members and safehouses, which were subsequently raided by police. Villarreal was arrested at the Legal Tender Saloon; he had told Magón to stay behind while he checked the building was safe, allowing the PLM leader to escape. Magón credited Villarreal for saving him from arrest and from then on considered him to be his own brother.

=== Arrests, escapes and prosecution ===
The Mexican consul in El Paso initially requested that Villarreal be charged with violating the Neutrality Act, but as the Juárez raid had not gone ahead as planned, there was a likelihood that Villarreal would be released on bail, allowing him to escape. While Villarreal was held in the El Paso jail, the Mexican government went through US immigration law to find a way to get him extradited. They discovered that US immigration law prohibited former convicts from entering the country, which made Villarreal's entry illegal, due to his prior conviction for the duel in 1901. On 25 February 1907, he was removed from his cell to be transferred over the border, where he was to be handed over to Mexican police, who had kept the border post under heavy guard to prevent any escape attempts. While on the way, Villarreal requested that he be allowed to send a telegram to his family informing them of his deportation; the US officers obliged him, and while they waited outside the Western Union offices, he escaped out a window. In March 1907, Villarreal joined Magón in hiding in Los Angeles. As they were both wanted, they were forced to stay out of the public eye and frequently move; unable to work and worried about exposing themselves at public soup kitchens, they relied on financial support from their supporters in order to eat.

By June 1907, the letters Magón and Villarreal had been sending out were intercepted and traced to Los Angeles. On 23 August 1907, Magón, Villarreal and Librado Rivera were arrested in their safehouse, following a lengthy fight between them and the arresting officers. After tying down Villarreal and Magón inside a coupé, an detective of the LAPD sat on Villarreal and kicked Magón, provoking Villarreal to bite the officer's neck. They continued fighting inside the carriage as it made its way to the jail, followed along the way by hundreds of PLM supporters. On 26 August, they were taken to court, where they were defended by the socialist lawyer A. R. Holston. They were greeted outside the courthouse by PLM supporters, who cheered them as they were marched in for the trial. As the proceedings began, socialist Job Harriman petitioned for habeas corpus, arguing that they had been arrested without a warrant and detained without charge. The following day, the police hastily filed charges against the three men for resisting arrest. Although Harriman managed to argue against these new charges, the judge kept them on remand, presuming that they would flee again if released from jail; Villarreal still had a deportation order in place against him. They were detained in jail, while the prosecution prepared the case for them to be extradited.

By the time of the extradition hearing in October 1907, as the prosecution had failed to make a case for it, their supporters had begun to believe they would be imminently released. Hundreds gathered outside the courthouse, where children released balloons with their names on them. The extradition case was dismissed, but before they could be released, new charges were brought against them under the Neutrality Act. Their personal correspondence with a foco cell in Douglas, Arizona, which showed them planning raids against Agua Prieta and Cananea, was presented as evidence of the three men violating US neutrality laws. The case was approved by the US attorney general and the three were put back in jail. They spent the next 19 months waiting for the case to proceed. While visiting Villarreal in jail, Ethel Duffy Turner smuggled out letters from the men in her skirt. As the case required that they be transferred to Arizona, in March 1909, they were removed to the state under heavy guard. In May 1909, they were prosecuted under the Neutrality Act and sentenced to 15 months in federal prison.

=== Later life ===
Between jail and prison, Villarreal and Magón had fallen out with each other over their conflicting political ideals. Villareal, who was a convinced socialist, did not share Magón's anarchist beliefs and was consequently expelled from the PLM executive committee in October 1908. The two were released from prison in August 1910 and remained together until their returned to Los Angeles. After being greeted in the city by hundreds of their supporters, the two went separate ways, with Villarreal going to stay with Lázaro Gutiérrez de Lara. The friendship between Villarreal and Magón continued to deteriorate, despite attempts by John Kenneth Turner to mediate between them; after a "tempestuous" meeting at Turner's house, the two never spoke to each other again.

With the outbreak of the Mexican Revolution in November 1910, Práxedis Guerrero was the first PLM member to volunteer to fight. On his way to the border, Guerrero stopped by the offices of Regeneración and challenged the leaders of the PLM to join him by writing "¿Hombres?" (English: Are you men?) on the window; Villarreal and Gutiérrez de Lara followed him, while Magón and Rivera remained behind in Los Angeles. Villarreal returned to Mexico to support Fracisco Madero's campaign in the 1911 presidential election. He moved to Mexico City where, together with Sarabia, he launched a new version of Regeneración. Magón attacked the paper and publicly accused Villarreal and Sarabia of being homosexual lovers. Villarreal initially ignored Magón's libel, which only enfuriated him further; he accused Villarreal of being a "pederast" and said that his lack of response confirmed the accusations. This provoked a response from Villarreal, who denounced Magón as a "swindler, coward, and a drunken pervert".

After Madero was deposed and killed, Villarreal joined the rebellion against Victoriano Huerta, rising through the ranks of the Constitutional Army to become a general and Governor of Nuevo León. After the revolution, he served as Secretary of Agriculture under Álvaro Obregón and implemented a series of land reform programmes.

Today, Villarreal is remembered in Mexico as one of the heroes of the Revolution.

== Bibliography ==
- Lytle Hernández, Kelly (2022). Bad Mexicans: Race, Empire and Revolution in the Borderlands. W. W. Norton. ISBN 978-1-324-00437-0.
- Sherman, John W. (1991). "Revolution on Trial: The 1909 Tombstone Proceedings Against Ricardo Flores Magón, Antonio Villarreal, and Librado Rivera". Journal of Arizona History. 32 (2): 173–194. JSTOR 41695872.
