= Magonista rebellion of 1911 =

Liberal uprising of the Mexican Revolution

Magonista Rebellion
- Part of the Mexican Revolution
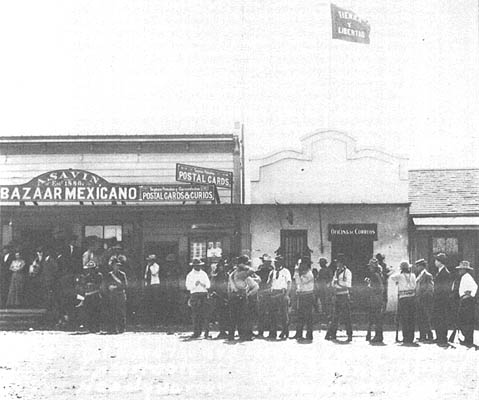
- Magonista guerrillas with the banner, "Tierra y Libertad" in Tijuana, 1911
Date	January–June 1911
Location	northern Baja California, Mexico
Result	Government victory, Federal forces recapture Tijuana, Initial victory for insurgents, Federal forces loyal to Madero eventually drove them out, failure of the Libertarian insurrection.

Belligerents
Partido Liberal Mexicano; Cocopah; Paipai; Kumeyaay Kiliwa	Porfirio Díaz, Mexico; Francisco I. Madero, Mexico

Commanders and leaders
José María Leyva; Vasquez Salinas; John R. Mosby; William Stanley; Caryl ap Rhys Pryce; Francisco Quijada	(Mexico) Celso Vega (Mexico) Guerrero

Strength
~220 militia	360 infantry ~200 militia

Casualties and losses
~20 killed ~10 wounded	12 killed ~10 wounded 1 captured

The Magonista rebellion of 1911 was an early uprising of the Mexican Revolution organized by the Liberal Party of Mexico (Spanish: Partido Liberal Mexicano, PLM), which was only successful in northern Baja California. It is named after Ricardo Flores Magón, one of the leaders of the PLM. The Magonistas controlled Tijuana and Mexicali for about six months, beginning with the liberation of Mexicali on January 29, 1911. The rebellion was launched against the rule of Porfirio Díaz but was put down by forces loyal to Francisco I. Madero. Acting on a tip from Madero's agents, leaders of the Magonista movement were arrested in the United States.

The rebellion was planned and coordinated by the Organizing Board of the Mexican Liberal Party from Los Angeles, California, to create a liberated and libertarian territory in Mexico, as the basis for extending a social revolution to the rest of the country. They implemented the 1906 Mexican Liberal Party Program in Baja California, and to a lesser extent, in other states such as Sonora, Chihuahua, Coahuila, Tlaxcala, Veracruz, Oaxaca, Morelos and Durango. The control of the Baja California peninsula was part of a contingency plan in case of suffering defeats in the northern states, so as to gain time for reorganizing the Liberal Army to later move towards the south of the peninsula and go to Sonora and Sinaloa.

In the uprising of November 20, 1910, Magonist and Maderist groups combined their forces to occupy important places in the northern states. However, the ideological differences between the two groups caused confrontations between them to arise soon after. The Magonistas were losing presence in Chihuahua; furthermore, some of their guerrilla leaders were arrested by Madero when they refused to recognize him as provisional president. When some Liberals managed to regroup in Baja California, a new campaign began with the capture of Mexicali.

== Overview ==
The uprising took place within a general uprising against the dictatorship of the Porfiriato but it soon distanced itself from the bourgeois democratic revolution of Madero, seeking rather to abolish property and create an anarchist worker's commune. However, though several cities were held for around half a year, the attempted revolution of magonista rebels turned out quite unsuccessfully, "with the insurgents crippled by dissensions between Americans, Mexicans and Indians, and with opportunism and lack of political principle rife among some of its leading actors." Compared to the agrarian revolution in Morelos, the Baja California revolt did not achieve much, but the PLM's influence on the outburst of revolution and its position as a revolutionary vanguard cannot be overlooked. Thus, while the material realization of the PLM program did not attain any lasting results, the ideas for which the revolt in Baja California were fought for remained a powerful element in the social transformation of the Revolution. Opponents of the PLM tried to paint their movement as being controlled by American interests, which was probably not the case, but the accusation was effective at reducing their support.

== Background ==
The tensions that led to the rebellion was due in part to preexisting tensions between conservative and radical parties in Southern California and Northern Mexico. The PLM supported the Mexican Revolution, the overthrow of Porfirio Díaz's dictatorship, the liberation of Baja California, and the welfare of indigenous peoples. They were also against American investment in Baja California, something they viewed as another form of imperialism. The PLM received a wide range of support from radical groups based in Southern California.

Preceding the revolution, the Magón brothers, Ricardo and Enrique Magón, were exiled from Mexico due to their criticisms of Díaz as well as their calls for social reforms. However, this did not stop their attempts to stir up a revolution against Díaz. The Magón brothers moved PLM's headquarters to Los Angeles, where many were "seething with social discontent", said Emma Goldman, fellow anarchist and social reformist. Here, the PLM found allies in many other left-wing groups, such as the Industrial Workers of the World (IWW), the Socialists, Chicanos, and trade unionists. Through their many speeches and their general activism within the labor community, their philosophy of anarchism was widely spread. Due to their pro-union and pro-workers stance, the radicals received popular support from the majority of the labor force and from sympathetic members of their community. The PLM especially appealed to migrant workers who have experienced the harsh working conditions in Northern Mexico.

The PLM's main ally was the IWW of Los Angeles, particularly, those who worked in the docks or were migrant workers. Those who worked on the docks were sympathetic to the cause as they approved of the militant organizing in PLM, and have consistently fought for control of the docks. According to John H. M. Laslett, they were "linked by a common interest in anarcho-syndicalist doctrine, grassroots militancy, and working-class internationalism." The IWW, as well as the Socialist Party, helped start the revolution by funding the PLM.

California operated under the open shop policy, much to the dismay of workers and union groups. This created tension between the labor force and business owners and helped developed an atmosphere where social radicalism was encouraged amongst workers. Due to their high capital investments in Southern California and Baja California, the radicals' agenda and public support alarmed many conservatives. They feared they would lose their land and property if the Magón brothers succeeded in inciting their revolution. This prompted many conservatives to publicly decry their disapproval and fear of the insurgent population, which intensified the divide between the two parties.

Media helped fuel this divide as well. The Los Angeles Times, one of the conservative papers during that time period, called supporters of Ricardo and Enrique Flores Magón, "greasers" and "wild-eyed-anarchists with smoking bombs in hand." The Regeneración, a revolutionary newspaper, published left-wing philosophy, and asked the public for support during the Mexican Revolution.

Since 1903 Colonel Celso Vega had been appointed governor of the northern district by Porfirio Díaz. Like the dictator, Colonel Vega did not enjoy respect among the population of Baja California.

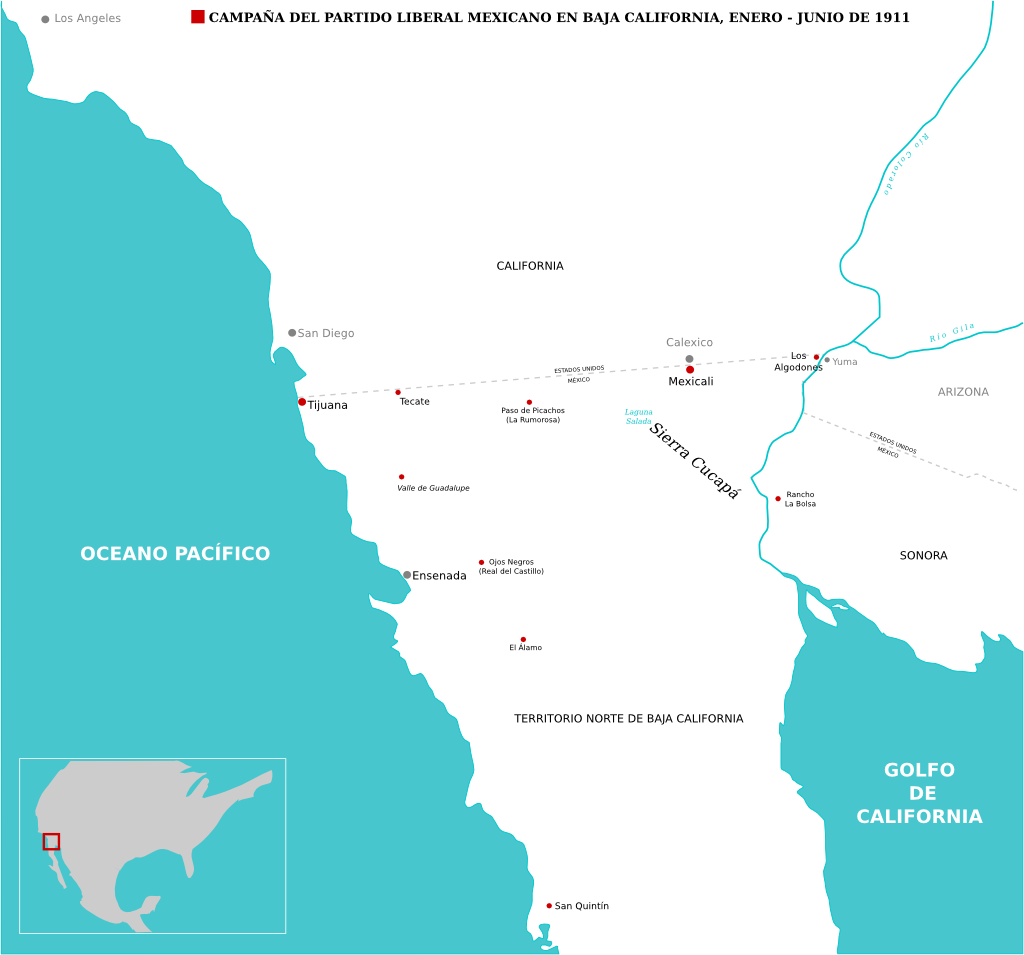
Campaign of the Liberal Party of Mexico in Baja California, 1911

== Revolution in Baja California ==
By 1906, the PLM had many operations in Mexico, the U.S. Southwest, as well as Southern California. Their second organized uprising, which was to take place in Mexico in June 1908, failed due to the Los Angeles Police Department's preemptive arrests. The Magón brothers were arrested under charges of treason and murder, but were released after a trial showed that the charges were unsubstantial. The arrest however, stirred up local support in Los Angeles, and hundreds of protesters, including the leaders of many labor groups, rallied around the two brothers. This wide support created backlash from American conservatives as well as right-winged newspapers, who shamed the public for their support.

After their release, the Magón brothers and the PLM organized another rebellion. They planned to liberate Baja California from Díaz and California land owners, and return that land to the indigenous people who previously lived there. However, despite the popular support the PLM received from either side of the border, the movement failed to recruit actual volunteers to fight in the revolution. In addition to this, the rebels were armed with little ammunition and had little funding to buy ammunition with.

In 1910, the Organizing Board of the PLM sent Fernando Palomares and Pedro Ramírez Caule, who had participated in Cananea Strike, to get in touch with the indigenous Camilo Jiménez and Antonio Cholay, with the objective of preparing maps of the land and organizing indigenous groups for armed struggle, gaining the support of the Cocopah, Paipai, Kumeyaay, and Kiliwa peoples. Since then the PLM's Organizing Board – which resided in Los Angeles – coordinated the propaganda, the provision of funds, the recruitment of volunteers and the general planning to attack Baja California. In 1911 the number of inhabitants in the towns of northern Baja California was: 1027 in Ensenada, 300 in Mexicali, 100 in Tijuana, less than 100 in Los Algodones and less than 100 in Tecate.

The Liberal Army had a few private soldiers who received a salary of 1 peso a day and the officers received a somewhat higher payment than their equivalent in the federal army. Given the low population in Baja California, the recruitment of foreigners resident in the United States was extensive. Some historians estimate that recruits were offered 100 to 600 US dollars in gold and farms of 160 acres each, although most likely the people who made these offers were the recruitment managers and not the PLM Board; also during the Organizing Board's trial in Los Angeles for violating US laws of neutrality during the Baja California rebellion, a smuggler stated that the US government had offered him and his companions exhoneration, in exchange for helping prosecute Flores Magón, Librado Rivera and Anselmo L. Figueroa, and mentioned that they then fabricated what they had been asked to by the Board in Los Angeles, and received 5 dollars and the promise of 160 acres of land.

=== Taking Mexicali ===
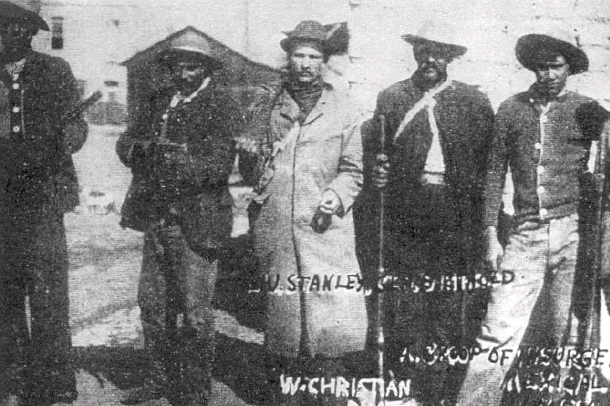
William Stanley (light coat) and Simón Berthold (center right) in Mexicali, 1911

The PLM campaign in the so-called Northern Territory of Baja California began on January 29, 1911, when about 30 rebels guided by José María Leyva and Simón Berthold, along with a group of residents, took the town of Mexicali without resistance; they opened the jail, occupied the barracks and confiscated government office funds. The majority of Mexicali residents crossed to Calexico, where they remained until June. Other settlers joined the rebels as well as many foreign socialists and anarchists; mainly militants (wobblies) of the Industrial Workers of the World (IWW). Later, on February 15 the PLM forces clashed with and defeated federal troops led by Porfirista Colonel Celso Vega. The victory increased the morale and number of the rebels; by the end of February there were already about 200 men (both Mexicans and foreigners) up in arms. In total, the Magonista forces reached 500 men, of which approximately 100 were Americans, including the wobblies Frank Little and Joe Hill. For its part, the US government in Calexico and Yuma had offered military support to the Mexican government to protect the hydraulic works that American engineers had carried out in the Colorado River since December 1910 with the authorization of the Porfiriato. The British sent HMS Shearwater and HMS Algerine to invade and occupy San Quintín to protect British interests and assets from the Magonistas.

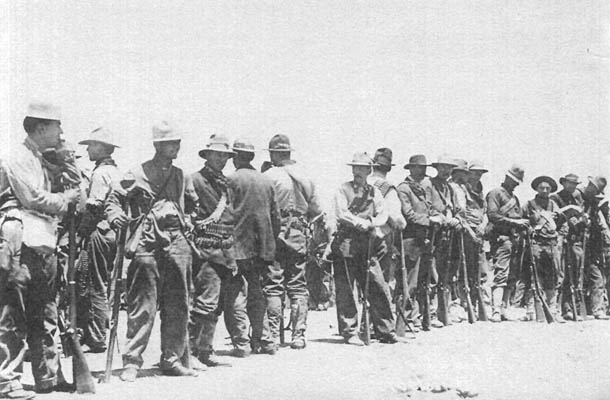
Magonistas in Tijuana after the first battle at the border town

In the month of March the Liberals attacked Tecate twice and both times were repelled. Then they marched to the town of El Alamo, southeast of Ensenada, where about 200 rebels managed to take the square; there Simon Berthold was mortally wounded. Days later, William Stanley also died in a clash with federal troops near Mexicali.

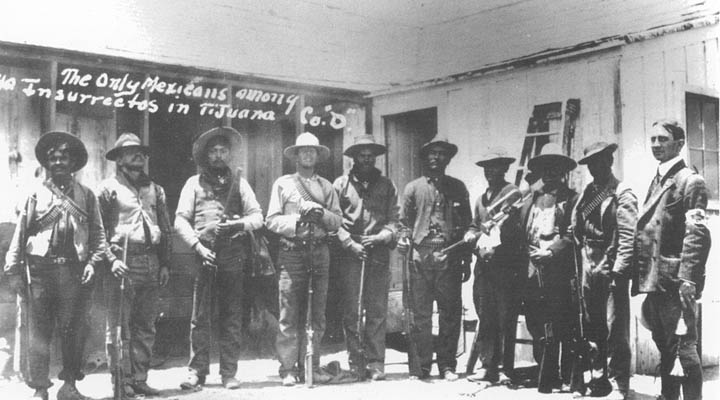
Magonist guerrillas of Mexican origin in the capture of Tijuana

In April, Mexican authorities reported a "sheaf of revolts" made up of approximately 400 men who were active in the Mexicali Valley. In the last days of April, 126 magonists led by John R. Mosby occupied Tecate without resistance. On May 2 the Liberals camped at the El Carrizo ranch, south of Tecate; there they were attacked by feds and Mosby was wounded in a lung; he was transferred to the US side of Tecate to be treated.

Enrique Flores Magón, through a May 20 article in The Regeneración, there were reports that the rebels had constructed a small library in Mexicali, where everyone who wanted it could go for education. The Conquest of Bread by Kropotkin, which the Liberals regarded as a kind of anarchist bible, served as a theoretical basis for the ephemeral revolutionary communes.

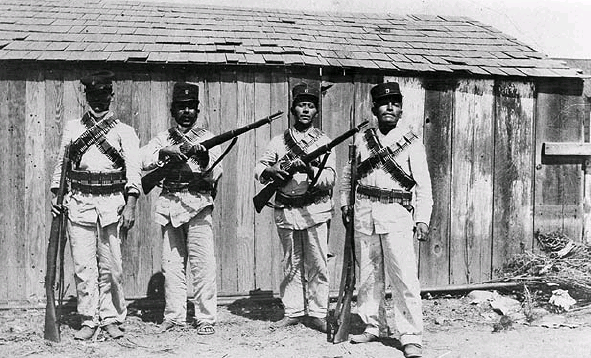
Porphyrist soldiers of the VIII Battalion of Mexicali who fought the Magonist rebellion

=== Taking Tijuana and Ensenada ===
After taking Tijuana and San Quintín and the capture of Ciudad Juárez, the revolution stalled due to a lack of volunteers, a lack of ammunition and heavy weapons, and in part due to Berthold's death, which resulted in a leadership crisis. The insurgents were pushed back after an engagement south of Tijuana, and the rebellion finally died out when Mexican Federal forces under Colonel Celso Vega retook the city.

== Consequences ==
=== Conservatives' growing distrust ===
The revolt failed to achieve its goal of liberating Baja California, but it showcased the popularity of radical groups. This was a great concern to Californian conservatives, who were still staunch supporters of the open shop policy, which suppressed unions and workers' rights in favor of business owners' rights. The possibility of an insurgent movement occurring in California cemented conservative attitudes towards both the immigrant population and the working classes. Faced with the threat of losing land investments, capital, as well as possible revenues, the conservatives only voiced their dismay louder. Following this episode, conservatives associated the Mexican insurgents with the many labor strikes in Los Angeles. This contributed to the "brown scare" in Los Angeles, in which the immigrant population were discriminated against and mistreated.

=== Magons' arrests ===
Following the invasion of these border towns, the Magón brothers were arrested again by the LAPD on the charge of failing to abide by United States neutrality laws. They were convicted in July 1912 and were sentenced to twenty-three months in jail. Ricardo Flores Magón was imprisoned again in 1918 and held in Fort Leavenworth. Despite many working for his release, he died in jail on November 21, 1922.

=== Fall of the leftists ===
After Díaz's fall from power, the rise of a new president, and increased suspicions from the conservatives, the radicals' power in Southern California diminished greatly. The PLM split into factions following the arrest of the Magón brothers. One faction still supported the Magón brothers, while the other faction supported the new president of Mexico. In addition to this, the alliances the radicals had formed prior to the revolution fell apart, and many Los Angeles trade union movements disintegrated as well.

== See also ==
- First Battle of Tijuana
- San Diego free speech fight
