= Práxedis G. Guerrero (disambiguation) =

Práxedis G. Guerrero was a Mexican Revolutionary leader who was killed in action in Janos, Chihuahua, on 29 December 1910.

Named for him:

- Práxedis G. Guerrero, Chihuahua
- Práxedis G. Guerrero (municipality)
