= Battle of Tijuana =

Battle of Tijuana may refer to one of two military encounters during the Mexican Revolution:

- First Battle of Tijuana (8–9 May 1911)
- Second Battle of Tijuana (22 June 1911)
