= Teresa Villarreal =

Mexican feminist revolutionary (born 1883)

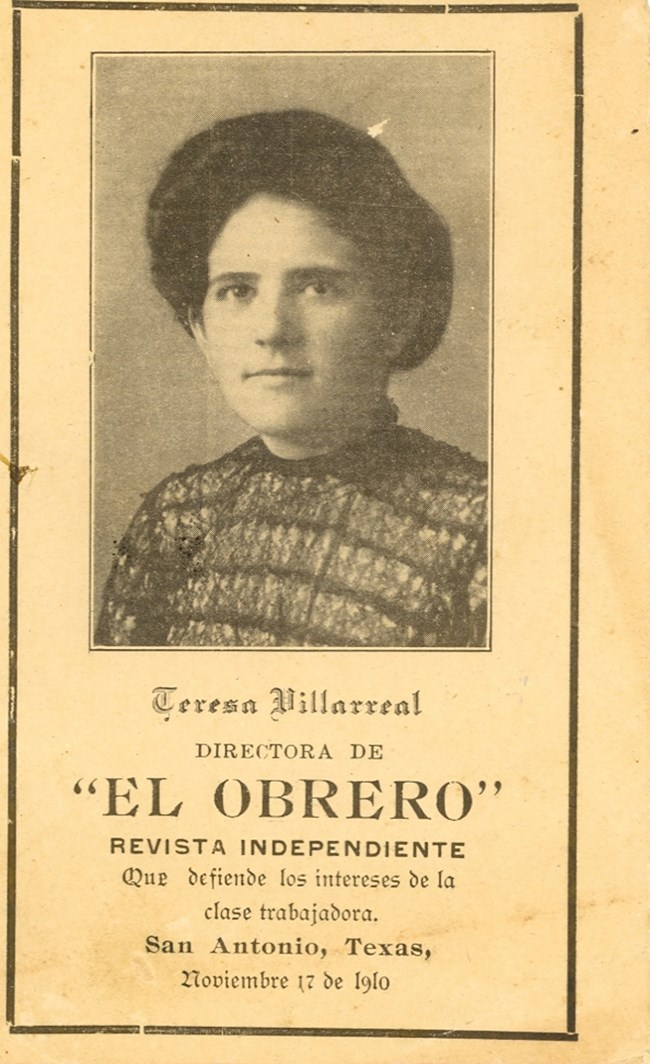
Teresa Villarreal on the cover of El Obrero, November 17, 1910

Teresa Villarreal González (born 1883 in Lampazos de Naranjo, Nuevo León, Mexico – died, date unknown San Antonio, Texas), was an active revolutionary labor and feminist organizer, who supported the Partido Liberal Mexicano (PLM) during the Mexican Revolution of 1910–1917. She was the sister of fellow activists and prominent PLM members Andrea Villarreal and General Antonio Irineo Villarreal González.

== Biography ==
Her father, Prospero Villarreal Zuazua, founded the Society of Lampazos Workers, Nuevo León, Mexico in 1887 and immersed the family in political activity from an early age.

She supported the liberal/radical Partido Liberal Mexicano (PLM) which opposed the dictatorship of President Porfirio Díaz (1876–1911). She was forced to flee Mexico in April 1901, with her father, sister and brothers to Texas because of repression of their activity by the Diaz regime. In February 1905 they moved on to St. Louis, Missouri, taking advantage the Expo which had attracted a community of radicals from many causes. Here they developed friendly relations with U.S. organizations with whom they shared interests, such as the Socialist Party, the American Federation of Labor (AFL) and the Industrial Workers of the World (IWW).

By 1909, Teresa and her older sister, Andrea, found a fertile environment in San Antonio, Texas, to spread their ideas against the dictatorship of Diaz regime through the Mexican press in exile which served the Mexican community in the southern United States. There she published two newspapers, the feminist newspaper La Mujer Moderna (The Modern Woman, 1910) and the revolutionary El Obrero (The Worker).

As the male leadership of the PLM was continuously under surveillance, the Villareal sisters and other women like them played key roles in the revolutionary cause. They performed tasks such as carrying messages, supplies and intelligence reports. One observer recalled how women like Andrea and Teresa Villareal took on responsibilities that men feared because of the heightened threats of the revolution: "Women in Texas were particularly active . . . had to continue the work men were now too intimidated to do." The sisters also made public speeches alongside Mother Jones demanding the release of Mexican revolutionaries imprisoned in San Antonio.

== See also ==
- Mexican Americans
- Chicana feminism
- Postcolonial feminism
- List of Mexican-American writers
- List of women writers
