= Magon =

Magon or Magón may refer to:

== People ==
=== The Flores Magón family of Mexico ===
- Enrique Flores Magón (1877–1954), Mexican anarchist of the Revolutionary period
- Jesús Flores Magón (1871–1930), Mexican politician and journalist, secretary of the interior in 1912
- Ricardo Flores Magón (1874–1922), Mexican anarchist of the Revolutionary period

=== The Magonid dynasty of Ancient Carthage ===
- Mago I of Carthage or Magon, 6th century BCE
- Mago II of Carthage or Magon, 4th century BCE
- Mago III of Carthage or Magon, 4th century BCE

=== Other people ===
- Mago (general), a Carthaginian general
- Magon Barca, the brother of Hannibal Barca
- Charles René Magon de Médine (1763–1805), French admiral
- Manuel González Zeledón (1864–1936), Costa Rican writer who published under the nom-de-plume "Magón"
- Jymn Magon (born 1949), U.S. television/film writer
- Magon (musician), (born 1985), an Israeli musician
- Rup Magon, Indian-Canadian musician

== Places ==
=== Named for Ricardo Flores Magón ===
- Metro Ricardo Flores Magón, a station of the Mexico City Metro
- Eloxochitlán de Flores Magón, city in the state of Oaxaca, Mexico
- Ricardo Flores Magón, Chiapas, in the municipality of Venustiano Carranza, Chiapas, Mexico
- Ricardo Flores Magón, Chihuahua, a city in the area code for Chihuahua, Mexico
- Ricardo Flores Magón, Durango, in the Canatlán Municipality, Mexico

=== Other places ===
- Cair Magon (Latin: Magnae), the Sub-Roman citadel at Kenchester, Herefordshire, England
- Teotitlán de Flores Magón, Oaxaca, Mexico, named for Enrique Flores Magón

== Other uses ==
- Several Tunisian wines are named after Mago, the Carthaginian agricultural writer
- Magón National Prize for Culture (named for Manuel González Zeledón), given by the government of Costa Rica
- Popular Indigenous Council of Oaxaca "Ricardo Flores Magón" (CIPO-RFM)
- French destroyer Magon

== See also ==
- Mago (disambiguation)
- Magonism, an anarchist school of thought based on the ideas of Ricardo Flores Magón
