= Marisol Valles García =

Mexican police officer (born 1989)

- Born: 1989 (age 36–37); Ciudad Juárez
- Police career
- Country: Mexico
- Service years: 2010–2011
- Status: Police chief

Marisol Valles García (born 1989, Ciudad Juárez, Chihuahua, Mexico) is the former police chief of Práxedis G. Guerrero located in the northern Mexican state of Chihuahua near the cities of Ciudad Juárez and Guadalupe. She was the only person to apply for this job. Valles and her family fled to the United States where they are currently seeking asylum.

== Background ==
Since Mexican President Felipe Calderón declared war on drug cartels in 2006, the country's death toll related to drug crime has been around 30,000. Mayors and police have been specifically targeted; some beheaded, some tortured to death.

In early October 2010, Tancítaro's mayor Gustavo Sánchez was found beaten to death with his hands tied behind his back. Elected in January, he'd stated "The fear is always there, but if you have courage and a desire to make a contribution, that outweighs the fear".

== Práxedis G. Guerrero Valley ==
Prior to the war on drugs, rural Práxedis G. Guerrero was a quiet town. Two rival drug gangs, the Juárez Cartel and the Sinaloa Cartel, now fight for control of the region's main highway, making Chihuahua one of the most dangerous places in the world. Residents hide in houses from fear of violence and death. In nearby Ciudad Juárez in October 2010, a gang killed over a dozen people, including children, at a birthday party. Several police officers in Ciudad Juárez have been abducted or killed, and Práxedis G. Guerrero's previous chief, Manuel Castro, was tortured and beheaded a year earlier.

=== Search for a police chief ===
With all but three police officers having quit, mayor José Luis Guerrero desperately sought solutions. After a year without a police chief, 20-year-old Marisol Valles García, who was a student working on a degree in criminology at the University of Guadalajara, was the only person willing to accept the job. She was sworn in on 18 October 2010. This attracted international attention, and has prompted news media to call her the "bravest woman in Mexico".

=== Threats and request for asylum ===
Within two weeks Valles García began receiving threatening phone calls with offers to work for the cartels. On 1 March 2011, she received a threat of kidnapping from a man who had harassed her for nearly four months. The same day Valles García and her family fled to the United States to seek asylum. She has since received a work permit in that country. She is currently living in El Paso, Texas. A play called "So Go the Ghosts of Mexico" by Matthew Paul Olmos, based on her experiences, opened at La MaMa Experimental Theatre Club, Manhattan, in April 2013.

== Personal life and views ==
Valles García is married and the mother of a boy. She reportedly took the job to change her community. "We're all afraid in Mexico now. We can't let fear beat us", she said after being sworn in.

The district has 9,148 inhabitants, and a police force of nineteen. Valles García said she intended to hire more women, and focus on community outreach and prevention. In neighboring Ciudad Juárez, she was referred to by locals with the iconic nickname "La Adelita".
