= Librado Rivera =

Mexican anarchist (1864–1932)

Librado Rivera El Fakir
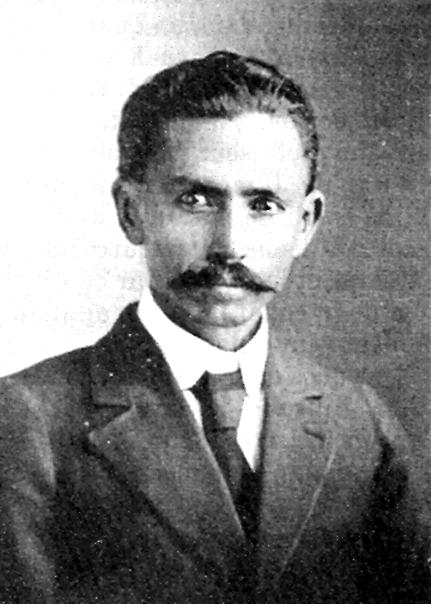
- Born: 17 August 1864; Rayón, San Luis Potosí, Mexico
- Died: 1 March 1932 (aged 67); Mexico City, Mexico
- Occupations: Teacher, journalist
- Political party: Mexican Liberal Party
- Movement: Anarchism in Mexico
- Criminal charges: Violations of the Neutrality Act of 1818 and the Espionage Act of 1917
- Criminal penalty: Imprisonment
- Spouse: Conchita Rivera
- Website: libradorivera.com

Librado Rivera (1864–1932) was a Mexican anarchist revolutionary, journalist and politician. He was one of the founders and leading figures of the Mexican Liberal Party (PLM). Rivera joined the Mexican liberal movement in the 1890s, as part of a circle led by Camilo Arriaga. He soon became affiliated with the brothers Ricardo and Enrique Flores Magón, with whom he fled to the United States to escape repression by the Porfiriato. From St. Louis, he published Regeneración and organized the PLM, with a view to carrying out a cross-border raid and igniting an insurrection against the Mexican state. Following an arrest and a close brush with deportation, Rivera went underground in Texas, where he organized clandestine cells of revolutionaries. He was eventually tracked down to Los Angeles, arrested, and convicted of violating the Neutrality Act. He was released from prison at the outbreak of the Mexican Revolution, during which he supported the Magonista rebellion of 1911. His anarchist principles led him to oppose the new government of Francisco Madero, which crushed the rebellion and marginalised the PLM's influence in Mexico. Rivera and the Flores Magón brothers soon alienated many of their allies, and after calling for an insurrection against anti-Mexican violence in Texas, they were convicted of violating the Espionage Act. Upon Rivera's release from prison, he was deported back to Mexico, where he died.

== Biography ==
=== Early life and activism ===
Librado Rivera was born on 17 August 1864, in Rayón, San Luis Potosí, Mexico. He worked as a teacher, specialising in history and geography. He and Juan Sarabia were two early members of a reading group led by former congressman Camilo Arriaga. Rivera was reserved and had ascetic personality, often remaining quiet during their meetings, for which the circle nicknamed him El Fakir. He used Arriaga's library to read radical tracts by anarchist philosophers, which convinced him that anyone with the right ideas and sufficient force could change history. Before long, Rivera would begin to identify himself as an anarchist.

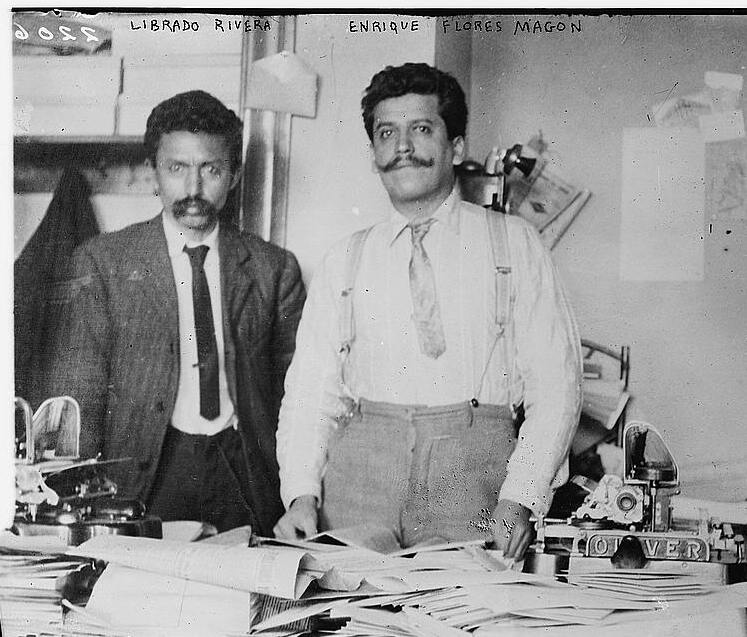
Rivera (left) and Enrique Flores Magón (right)

In March 1901, Ricardo and Enrique Flores Magón began circulating a manifesto written by Arriaga, Rivera and Sarabia, who had announced plans to challenge dictator Porfirio Díaz at the 1904 Mexican general election. On 24 January 1902, a conference of San Luis Potosí's liberal groups, hosted by of Arriaga's group, was raided by police. Arriaga and Rivera managed to escape out the door, but the other 25 attendees were all detained. Arriaga and Rivera were arrested later that night in Arriaga's home. Arriaga, Rivera and Sarabia were all given a one-year sentence in Belem Prison, where they were each kept in separate underground cells under constant guard.

By January 1903, Rivera and his comrades had been released and reunited in Mexico City. After they published an issue of the newspaper El hijo del Ahuizote, in which they accused Díaz of opening Mexico up to foreign exploitation, on 16 April, their offices were raided by police. Rivera, along with Sarabia and the Flores Magón brothers, was arrested and charged with contempt toward officials. They were released from prison later that year. The group then fled over the Mexico–United States border into San Antonio, where they attempted to continue their journalism under freedom of the press.

=== Journalism in St. Louis ===
In February 1905, they moved to St. Louis, where they resumed publication of Regeneración. Rivera contributed a number of articles to the publication, spending his free time with his family, who he had brought to live with him in the United States. Before long, they were printing and distributing weekly issues to almost 20,000 subscribers.

In September 1905, the editorial collective established the Mexican Liberal Party (PLM), which vowed to remove Díaz and reestablish democracy "by any means necessary". The collective transformed into the party's Organizing Council of the Mexican Liberal Party, on which Librado Rivera served as a voting member. After their offices were raided, and Sarabia and the Flores Magón brothers were forced into hiding, Rivera and Andrea Villarreal took over Regeneración. Rivera was one of the few PLM members who remained in the city, although he mostly stayed in his apartment out of fear of being arrested.

On 31 October 1906, two detectives disguised as gas company employees entered his apartment and began searching it. Rivera tried to jump out of the window, but they grabbed him and pulled him back in. He told them his name was Herbert Koro, and that he was an Argentine immigrant who worked as a cleaner. To give the police time to investigate his identity, he was detained in a hospital while he was medically examined.

In hospital, he saw a former printer's assistant who had worked at Regeneración, called him over, and told him everything he knew about the fugitive PLM leaders. The man, who was a police informant, reported the meeting and confirmed his true identity to the police. Rivera was put in jail and prepared for extradition to Mexico. The consulate and the police conspired to illegally transport him over the border, without any extradition proceedings. They put him on a train south, but were forced to bring him back after Villareal exposed the story in the press. His extradition case was quickly dismissed, on grounds that Mexico had provided no evidence he had committed a crime that required extradition. Rivera was allowed to return home, and soon after, went underground to avoid another arrest.

=== Fugitive activities ===
By January 1907, police had tracked Rivera down in Texas, where he had linked up with the PLM's weapons smuggler Antonio de Pío Araujo and was planning a raid over the border into Matamoros. The raid was put on hold until Flores Magón gave them the signal, so River continued moving around Texas, fearing he was about to be apprehended and not knowing how to escape. He could not afford to eat for months, so he wrote letters out begging for funds from his comrades around the country. He sent some of the money back to his wife, Conchita Rivera, who had just given birth to their third child in St. Louis. She struggled to raise their children as a working single parent and expressed frustration in letters to Rivera, telling him she wanted to return to Mexico without him. His mother also sent him letters, demanding he quit his revolutionary activism for the good of his family, who she said had only suffered as a result of his decisions. Despite the pleas of his wife and mother, River decided to continue his activities with the PLM and remained a fugitive, constantly on the move.

On 23 August 1907, Rivera was arrested alongside Ricardo Flores Magón and Antonio Villarreal, in a police raid on Flores Magón's house in Los Angeles. He resisted arrest for almost an hour, before collapsing, exhausted and beaten. He again attempted to resist when a surrey arrived to pick him up, but the police choked him and threw him into the carriage. They were taken to the local jail, followed by a crowd of hundreds of Mexican onlookers, who cheered the PLM members as they were brought in.

=== Legal proceedings ===
Their trial began on 26 August, at the Los Angeles County Court. They were brought from the county jail to the courthouse, cheered on by PLM supporters along the way. Their defense lawyer, Job Harriman, argued that they had been arrested and detained without charge, and alleged that the police had acted under orders from the Mexican government. Harriman managed to convince the judge that they had been arrested without a warrant, forcing the police to hurry to their headquarters and file charges for resisting arrest. The judge agreed to keep them under remand for these new charges. Harriman then argued that they had a right to resist arrest, as they had been arrested without a warrant, but the defendants were kept under remand, out of fear they might flee; although Rivera had no outstanding warrants against him, his underground operations since his release from St. Louis was held against him.

They remained in jail while extradition proceedings were initiated against them; meanwhile, federal authorities soon gave Los Angeles prosecutors the clear to prosecute them under the Neutrality Act. In October 1907, when they were brought back to the courthouse, the PLM leaders were again greeted by a crowd of hundreds of Mexican supporters. The Commissioner quickly dismissed the extradition case and ordered the defendants to be released from custody, upon which the prosecutor immediately charged them with violating the Neutrality Act, citing correspondence they had with a cell in Douglas that was planning a raid into Agua Prieta.

An arrest warrant was subsequently issued by US attorney general Charles Joseph Bonaparte and the men were again detained, with bail set at $5,000 (equivalent to $168,339 in 2024). Despite attempts by their lawyer to block it, in March 1909, they were transferred to Arizona. They were charged with violating the Neutrality Act, and in May 1909, they were sentenced to 15 months in prison. While in prison, Rivera was regularly visited by his wife, who did his laundry from him twice per week. He also received visits from the American activists Ethel Duffy Turner and Elizabeth Trowbridge, who helped smuggle PLM orders out of the prison.

=== Revolution ===
In August 1910, Rivera, Flores Magón and Villarreal were released from prison and returned to Los Angeles, where they were greeted by cheering crowds. Rivera reunited with his family, with whom he went to stay at the Hotel Chapman. The outbreak of the Mexican Revolution in November 1910 caught Rivera in Los Angeles. Rivera met with the Flores Magón brothers and Juan Sarabia, where they discussed the ongoing Magonista rebellion in Baja California and a proposed alliance with Francisco Madero. They refused the alliance, citing their anarchist principles of anti-statism and anti-capitalism. Madero subsequently crushed the Baja rebellion, marginalising the role of the PLM in the Revolution.

They quickly lost supporters, and before long, Rivera was one of only a few people who remained loyal to Ricardo Flores Magón. Mother Jones reported that, when she and Harriman had met Rivera and the Flores Magón brothers, they threw out accusations of betrayal and remained unmoved from their principles of direct action and the abolition of private property, which alienated the two visitors from their former allies. In September 1911, Rivera, the Flores Magón brothers and Anselmo L. Figueroa reorganized the PLM into an explicitly anarchist organization, replacing its 1906 party platform with a new manifesto that called for war against all forms of authority.

In 1912, Rivera and the other PLM leaders were convicted again for violations of the Neutrality Act, due to their role in the Baja rebellion. They were imprisoned for two years in the McNeil Island Corrections Center. By the time they had returned to Los Angeles in 1915, mass anti-Mexican violence known as La Matanza had broken out in Texas.

Rivera took his children to live on a commune, alongside the Flores Magón brothers and their families. After months of communal life, they resumed publication of Regeneración, which put them under constant financial strain. In the paper, they praised the Plan of San Diego and called for an insurrection against the US authorities in Texas. In 1918, the commune was raided by police, and Rivera and the Flores Magón brothers were arrested on charges of violating the Espionage Act. They were soon convicted, with Rivera being sentenced to 15 years in Leavenworth federal prison.

After Ricardo Flores Magón's death, Rivera was released from prison and deported back to Mexico. He continued to participate in the activities of the Mexican anarchist movement until his death in a traffic collision in 1932. Today, Rivera is remembered by Mexican society as one of the heroes of the Revolution.

== Bibliography ==
- Lytle Hernández, Kelly (2022). Bad Mexicans: Race, Empire and Revolution in the Borderlands. W. W. Norton. ISBN 978-1-324-00437-0.
