= José María Leyva =

Mexican revolutionary

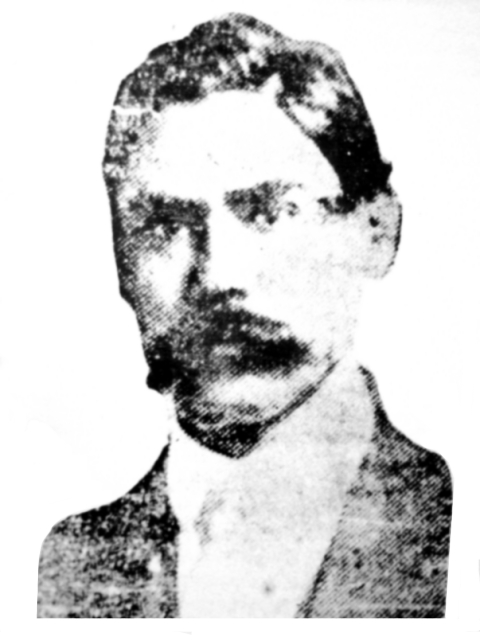
- Born: 2 April 1877; Sinaloa, Mexico
- Died: 1956 (aged 78–79); Mexico City, Mexico
- Military career
- Allegiance: Magonistas (1911); Constitutionalists (1911–1914)
- Rank: General
- Conflicts: Magonista rebellion of 1911: Capture of Mexicali; Second Battle of Tijuana

José María Leyva (2 April 1877 – 1956) was a Mexican revolutionary. Initially a commander of the Magonista rebellion of 1911, he later joined the Maderistas and continued to support the constitutionalist movement until the culmination of the Mexican Revolution.

== Biography ==
=== Magonista rebellion ===
On 28 January 1911, Leyva and his lieutenant Simón Berthold led a detachment of 17 men across the United States-Mexico border. Armed only with old Springfield rifles, they had captured the city of Mexicali by the following day. Following their victory, American volunteers began to arrive in Mexicali. One detachment, led by sergeant Stanley Williams, captured and burned down the customs house at Los Algodones. Leyva expelled Williams back to the United States shortly afterwards.

On 14 March, Leyva and Berthold led a detachment of 200 men from Mexicali to counter the Eighth Battalion, led by Justino Mendieta. At Laguna Salada, the Mexicali detachment divided itself, with Leyva leading 140 men towards Tecate and Berthold taking the remaining 60 towards El Alamo. On 19 March, Leyva arrived at Tecate, which was being held by Mendieta's battalion. The rebels were repelled, with 15 men being killed and the survivors fleeing back to Mexicali. Upon arrival back in Mexicali, on 26 March, Leyva relinquished command of the detachment and went back over the border to the United States, leaving Francisco Velázquez in command.

=== Defection to the Maderistas ===
On 1 April, Leyva returned to Mexicali and rejoined the revolutionary forces, this time in a subordinate position. After the constitutionalist victory in the Battle of Ciudad Juárez, Leyva switched revolutionary factions from the Magonistas to the Maderistas. In June, the government of Francisco León de la Barra appointed Leyva to head a peace commission to Baja California, in order to convince the rebels to lay down their arms. He managed to convince Francisco Quijada, commander of the First Division, to surrender Mexicali. He then moved on to San Diego, where they attempted to convince John R. Mosby, commander of the Second Division, to surrender Tijuana. But the negotiations fell through, and Tijuana was retaken by the federal forces after an hours-long battle with Mosby's division.

== Bibliography ==
- Gerhard, Peter (1946). "The Socialist Invasion of Baja California, 1911". Pacific Historical Review. 15 (3): 295–304. doi:10.2307/3635477. ISSN 0030-8684. JSTOR 3635477.
- Lozano, Miguel López (2009). "Bandits, Captives, Heroines, and Saints: Cultural Icons of Mexico's Northwest Borderlands". Revista de Estudios Hispánicos. 43 (3). St. Louis: 693–695.
- Taylor, Lawrence D. (2007). "Fighting for the patria on the 'wrong' side of the border: The role of the Mexican consuls in the federal campaign against the magonista rebels in Baja California in 1911". Journal of Borderlands Studies. 22 (2): 1–20. doi:10.1080/08865655.2007.9695674. ISSN 0886-5655.
