= John Mosby =

John Mosby may refer to:

- John S. Mosby (1833–1916), Confederate army cavalry battalion commander
- John R. Mosby, member of the Industrial Workers of the World
- John Mosby, editor of the action entertainment magazine Impact
