= Simón Berthold =

Mexican anarchist militant (died 1911)

Simón Berthold Chacón
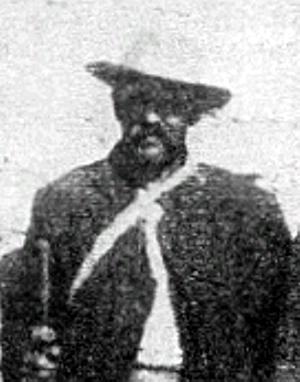
- Born: Nacozari de García, Sonora, Mexico
- Died: April 14, 1911; El Álamo, Baja California, Mexico
- Military career
- Allegiance: Mexican Liberal Party
- Service: Liberal Army
- Service years: 1911
- Conflicts: Magonista rebellion: Capture of Mexicali

Simón Berthold Chacón was a Mexican anarchist militant who acted as a commander of the Liberal Army during the Magonista rebellion of 1911 in Baja California.

== Biography ==
Simón Berthold Chacón was born in Nacozari, Sonora, son of a German father and a Mexican mother. He emigrated to the United States. He was a member of the Mexican Liberal Party (PLM) and was second in command of the Liberal Army Division in Baja California.

On January 29, 1911, Berthold and José María Leyva took the town of Mexicali with a group of 30 guerrillas, marking the beginning of the Magonista rebellion of 1911.

At the end of February 1911, Berthold and Leyva informed the press that the objective of the campaign was to create an "independent socialist republic" or a cooperative commonwealth in Baja California.

In March 1911, he attacked Tecate on two occasions, but without succeeding in capturing the plaza. Berthold then marched to El Álamo, a town southwest of Tecate, which the PLM managed to capture on March 21. However, on the way back to El Álamo, Berthold was wounded in the leg by a bullet by Alberto Rodríguez (El cachora), a sniper of indigenous origin, to whom the Porfirians had supplied with a photograph of the PLM commander.

He died of his wounds on April 14, 1911, in El Álamo, Baja California.
