= Práxedis Guerrero =

Mexican anarchist (1882–1910)

Práxedis G. Guerrero
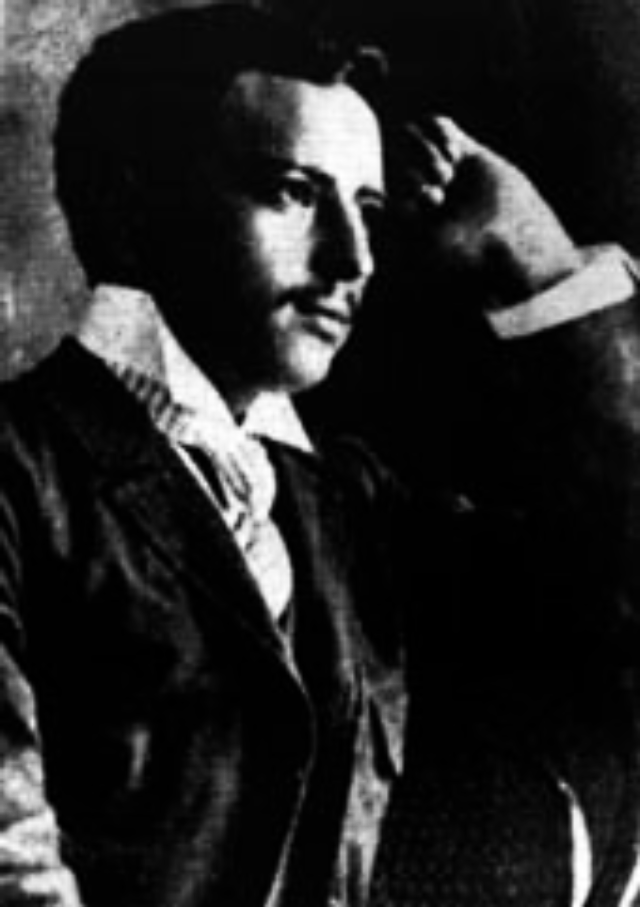
- Born: 28 August 1882; San Felipe, Guanajuato
- Died: 30 December 1910 (aged 28); Janos, Chihuahua
- Military career
- Allegiance: Mexican Liberal Party (PLM)
- Service years: 10
- Rank: General

Práxedis Gilberto Guerrero Hurtado (28 August 1882 – 30 December 1910) was a Mexican anarchist poet, journalist and fighter who served as an insurgent leader during the 1910 Revolution.

== Biography ==
Guerrero was originally from Los Altos de Ibarra near León, Guanajuato, where his parents owned a hacienda. After finishing his secondary schooling, he began working as a labourer. In 1899 he submitted his first articles to the newspapers El Heraldo Comercial and El Despertador. In 1901, Filomeno Mata appointed him a correspondent on Diario del Hogar and, that same year, he enlisted as a reservist in the National Army, where he reached the rank of second lieutenant (cavalry).

In 1903 he began to read newspapers that opposed the ongoing dictatorship of President Porfirio Díaz, including El Demófilo and El hijo del Ahuizote; he also met several anarchist writers. After the army (under orders from Gov. Bernardo Reyes) opened fire on a liberal demonstration in Monterrey, Nuevo León, on 2 April of that year, he resigned his commission in the reserves.

In 1904 he relocated to the United States and began working as a mine labourer in Denver, Colorado. In 1905 he moved to San Francisco, California, where he published the newspaper Alba Roja ("Red Dawn"); In May 1906 Guerrero was visited by Manuel Sarabia, who invited him to participate on the Organizing Committee of the Mexican Liberal Party (JOPLM).

In addition to Alba Roja, Guerrero worked on other papers, including Revolución (1908) and Punto Rojo (1909), which had a weekly print-run of 10,000 copies in El Paso, Texas, and joined its voice to calls for a general strike; he also contributed to Regeneración, published by the Flores Magón brothers. He was a member of the Mexican Liberal Party (PLM) and fought in the party's military campaigns.

In September 1910, Regeneración published the stories of three 1908 revolutionary episodes, in which Guerrero described PLM attacks on the settlements of Las Vacas (modern-day Ciudad Acuña, Coahuila), Viesca, Coahuila, and Puerto Palomas, Chihuahua, intended to spark a social revolution across Mexico.

The liberal opposition to Díaz's regime finally declared open rebellion on 20 November 1910, under Francisco I. Madero's Plan de San Luis. Guerrero, who had been appointed Chief of Operations of the Confederation of Groups of the Liberal Army in Mexico, decided to raise an armed force in El Paso, Texas, and lead it across the border, even with the disapproval of the PLM's Organizing Committee, which wanted him to dedicate his efforts to writing and reporting.

On 22 December, some 30 revolutionaries led by Guerrero entered Mexico through Ciudad Juárez, Chihuahua, attacked a hacienda, sequestered a train, and advanced toward the south, destroying the railway bridges as they passed. At Estación Guzmán, Chihuahua, they were joined by another 20 insurgents; there, on 25 December, they split into two groups, the larger one led by Guerrero and the other by Prisciliano Silva.

Guerrero took the town of Corralitos on 27 December and, the following day (unsuccessfully) demanded the surrender of Casas Grandes. During the night of 29 December, he led his forces on an attack on Janos and, by the following morning, the town was in rebel hands.

That same day, however, Práxedis Guerrero was killed. The circumstances of his death are unclear, and there are at least three different versions of the incident. Ethel Duffy Turner claims he was shot by one of his men who confused Guerrero with a spy as he was gaining higher ground to conduct reconnaissance; Martínez Nuñez says Guerrero was shot in the right eye while climbing onto a roof to repel an attack by federal forces; while Enrique Flores Magón reports that Guerrero was shot in the forehead while explaining the ideals of the PLM to the assembled townsfolk.

== Legacy ==
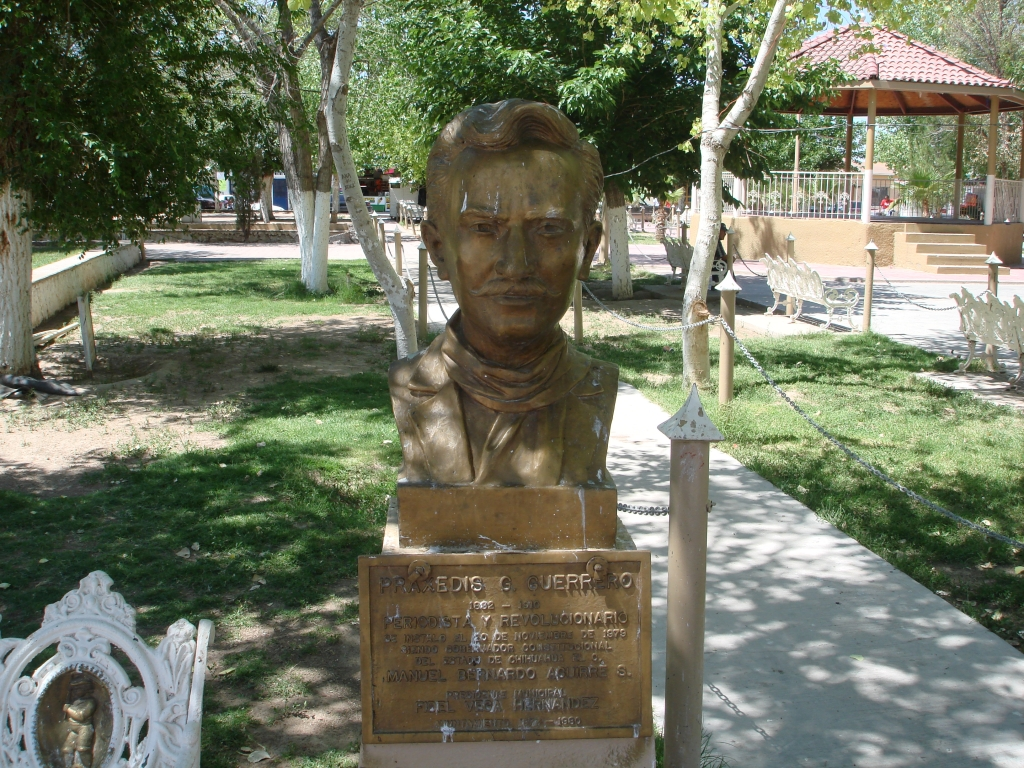
Bust of Guerrero in the municipality of Práxedis G. Guerrero

In Chihuahua, Práxedis Guerrero has a town and a municipality. In 1911 an elementary school in Chihuahua City was named after him, which is still in use. Another settlement in the state of Durango also bears his name.

== See also ==
- Magonism
