= First Battle of Tijuana =

- Part of the Mexican Revolution
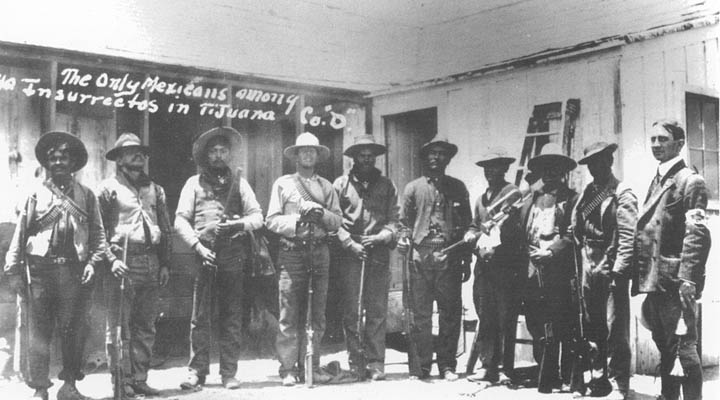
- The only Mexican Magonistas who fought at the battle.
Date	May 8–9, 1911
Location	Tijuana, Baja California, Mexico
Result	Magonista victory, rebels capture Tijuana.

Belligerents
Liberal Party: Liberal Army	Government: Federal Army

Commanders and leaders
Caryl Ap Rhys Pryce	Col. Guerrero

Strength
~220 infantry	200 infantry

Casualties and losses
~20 killed ~10 wounded	12 killed ~10 wounded 1 captured

The First Battle of Tijuana was an early engagement of the Mexican Revolution and the first significant victory for the Magonistas. Tijuana was captured and held by rebel forces on May 9, 1911 and was used as a haven for recruiting American volunteers from California.

== Background ==
The tourist port of Tijuana in 1911 was a small settlement of less than 100 people during the time of battle, most of whom were Anglos from the United States. When rebel forces of the Partido Liberal Mexicano captured Mexicali with little resistance, the rebels split their force in two, a first and second division were created. The "First Division" stayed in Mexicali while the "Second Division" was ordered to take Tijuana. The Second Division arrived outside Tijuana on May 7, 1911. All but ten of the Magonistas were Anglo-American with a few African-American volunteers that were dubbed filibusters by the federal Mexican government.

== Battle ==
Most of the populace of Tijuana evacuated due to the fear of battle. This left a company of 220 Magonistas against 200 federal Mexican Army troops to contend for the port town. The civilians who fled went north and alarmed the authorities in California so a force of United States cavalry was ordered to the border, American citizens and soldiers watched the battle from the roof tops of San Ysidro or from the train tracks running along the border. Just before dawn on May 8, 1911, the Welsh rebel General Caryl ap Rhys Pyrce requested the surrender of the Mexican Army commander Colonel Guerrero. The request of surrender was refused so at dawn the Magonista's surrounded Tijuana on the east and southern side. The two sides skirmished in the process of these maneuvers.

When full daylight was at hand, Colonel Guerrero launched a counterattack to the south but this assault was beaten back and Guerrero was wounded. The federals fell back to their stronghold of breastworks at the center of Tijuana while the Magonistas attacked the Mexican customs house. After taking that building the liberal forces raised their colors, a red flag bearing the words "Land and Freedom" in Spanish. Once the customs building was captured the rebels then pushed forward to the bullfighting ring where the federals had built fortifications. Fighting continued until the night of May 9, by that time many of the structures in Tijuana were burning.

With the wounding of their commander, and mounting casualties, Colonel Guerrero ordered a retreat and fled Tijuana to California with the bulk of his force, some others escaped south down the coast to Ensenada. A total of 12 federal troops were killed, around ten others were wounded and most of the survivors were interned by the United States Army when they entered California territory. Only one federal troop was captured, he was later court-martialed and released north of the border. About twenty rebels were killed in action, they also suffered about ten men wounded.

== Aftermath ==
Immediately after the battle looting occurred, much of the plunder was taken north. The Tijuana engagement resulted in an important strategic victory for the Magonistas. They could now be resupplied from the sea or from their junta in Los Angeles. More importantly, Tijuana was used as a point of recruitment of American volunteers.

At the same time General Pyrce took Tijuana, rebel forces were fighting and winning the major Second Battle of Ciudad Juarez on the Texas border. The Ciudad Juarez battle along with the Zapatista victories in central Mexico, quickly was leaving the federal government of Porfirio Diaz into chaos. The Magonista's held Tijuana for over a month before being defeated at the Second Battle of Tijuana

== See also ==
- Magonism
- Pancho Villa Expedition
