= John Kenneth Turner =

American journalist

John Turner
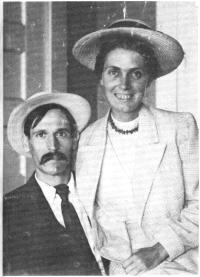
- Turner and his wife, Ethel c. 1920
- Born: John Kenneth Turner; April 5, 1879; Portland, Oregon, U.S.
- Died: July 31, 1948; Salinas, California, U.S.
- Occupation(s): Publisher, journalist, and author
- Spouse: Ethel Duffy Turner 1905-1925 Adriana Spadoni 1925-1948

John Kenneth Turner (April 5, 1879 – July 31, 1948) was an American publisher, journalist, and author. His book Barbarous Mexico helped discredit Mexican President Porfirio Díaz's regime in the eyes of the American public.

== Early life ==
Turner was born in Portland, Oregon to Enoch and Laura Frances (née Kelly) Turner. His father was a printer at the Portland Oregonian. In 1880, the family operated a printing shop in Stockton, California, where Turner spent his youth and learned the printing business. His grandfather was a Methodist minister who had migrated from Kentucky to Oregon on the Oregon Trail in 1849. He was the brother of United States Navy Admiral Richmond Kelly Turner.

At 16, Turner began to develop an interest in socialism and at 17, published the weekly paper "Stockton Saturday Night," which concerned itself with uncovering corruption among politicians and businessmen. He began his career as a schoolteacher and studied at the University of California, Berkeley, where he met Ethel Evelyn Duffy when he was 25. Duffy was an 18-year-old English major who was also inclined toward socialism. They married in 1905, left the college and settled in San Francisco.

Turner was hired as a stringer for the Fresno Republican. After losing their apartment in the 1906 San Francisco earthquake, the couple spent a brief period in Portland, Oregon. He edited sports at the Portland Journal before moving to Los Angeles. In Los Angeles, Turner worked as a reporter for the Los Angeles Herald.

== Career ==
=== Writing Barbarous Mexico ===
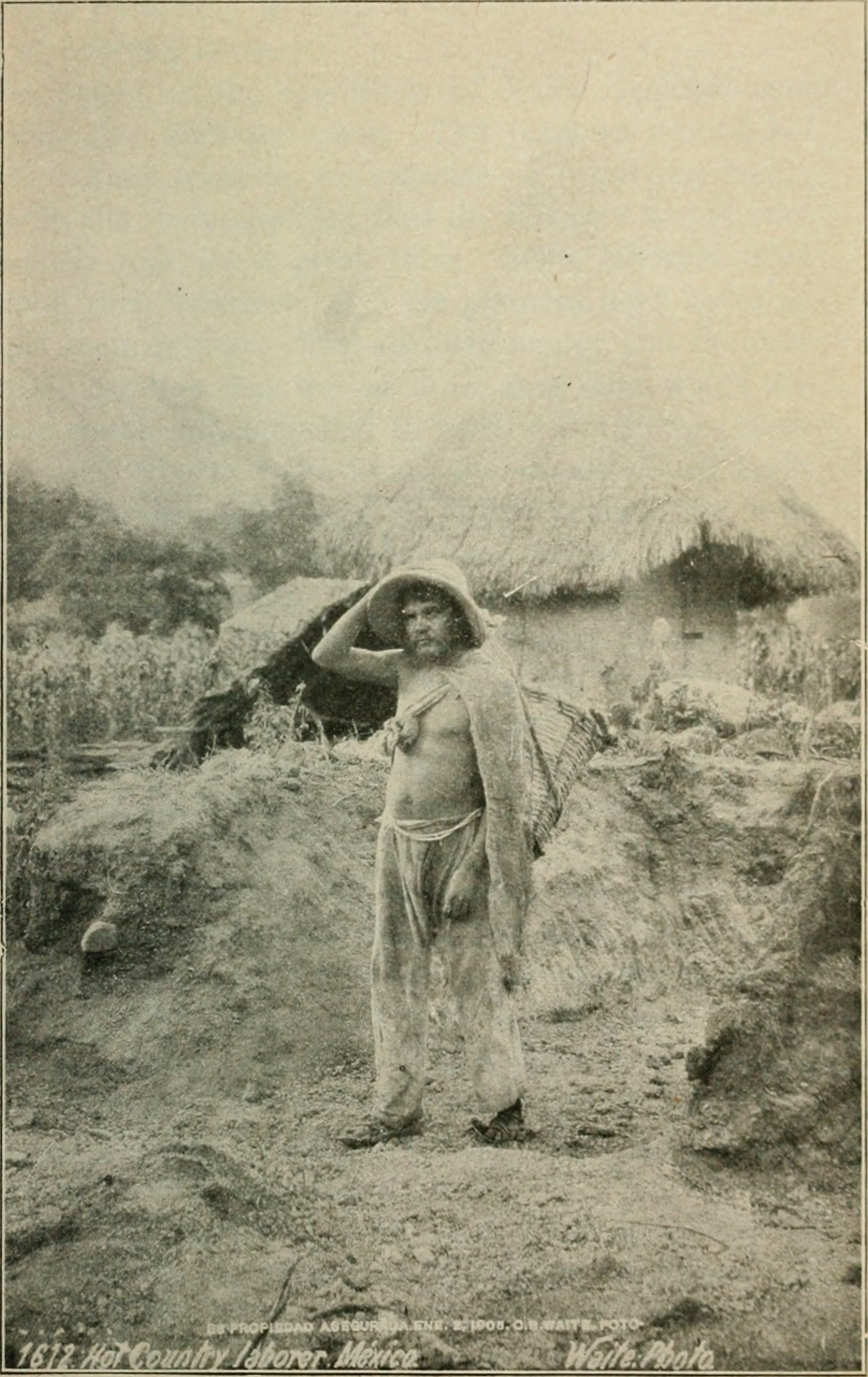
Photographs illustrated Barbarous Mexico. They used to have sensational captions describing slavery in Mexico.

In Los Angeles, Turner met the Socialist Party leaders Job Harriman and John Murray. They introduced him to Mexican anarcho-syndicalist leaders Ricardo Flores Magón, Librado Rivera, Manuel Sarabia, and Antonio Villareal in April 1908. They were clients of Harriman's and accused of violating neutral laws of the United States to plan a revolution in Mexico. In an interview, they told Turner about the exploitation and slavery in Diaz's regime.

The interview with the Mexican anarcho-syndicalists caused a movement among American radicals to free the prisoners in Los Angeles County Jail. The encounter with them was also the starting point for Turner's book Barbarous Mexico.

From 1908 to 1911, the Turners were involved in Mexico's revolutionary movement, and Barbarous Mexico, criticizing the corruption and brutal labor system under Diaz, played a role in accelerating it. Turner posed undercover as a tobacco buyer for a New York firm, following the trend in undercover reporting Elizabeth Cochrane started. The wealthy Bostonian Elizabeth Darling Trowbridge sponsored his travel. Mexican lawyer Lázaro Gutiérrez de Lara assisted him.

Turner joined Ethel in Tucson, Arizona. He prepared Mexico stories there. He got a contract with American Magazine to serialize his story. Its editor John Sanborn Phillips sent him back to Mexico to investigate the Mexican government's role in the peonage system. Turner worked as a sportswriter in the English-language newspaper Mexico Herald to continue his undercover report. In October 1909, the first installment of Barbarous Mexico was released. In his writings about Mexico, Turner appealed to emotions, and he was criticized for sensationalism and a lack of facts.

The Porfirian regime discredited Barbarous Mexico in Mexican and American media. Among the owners of the press that criticized Turner's report were people who invested in Mexico and owned properties there, such as William Randolph Hearst of the liberal magazine Cosmopolitan. Diaz's supporters pushed American Magazine to drop the report.

Barbarous Mexico returned in the media through the socialist weekly Appeal to Reason. The newspaper published six articles from the book and other related articles by Turner.

=== Collaboration with the Mexican Liberal Party ===
Together with WFM Mexican miners, Turner welcomed Flores Magón and his followers when they were released from prison in Florence, Arizona, in August 1910. They escorted the Mexican revolutionaries due to fear of an ambush by the Mexican government.

At this point, Turner adopted an active role in the revolutionary movement. He directed the crowd and announced that "only an armed revolution" could solve Mexico's problems. He collaborated for the newspaper Regeneración of the Mexican Liberal Party, led by Flores Magón. Meanwhile, his wife Ethel edited the English version of the paper.

Turner also helped to get weapons for the revolutionaries of the Mexican Liberal Party. At the end of January, he shipped 60 rifles, a few revolvers, and 9,000 rounds of ammunition by rail to a California farmer who sent them to Mexico as “farm machinery”. During this period, Turner withdrew from journalism.

Turner questioned the Magonists' tactics, and was disappointed in the Flores Magón brothers' decision to reject the Mexican liberal President Francisco I. Madero. At the end of 1912, Turner returned to Mexico and collaborated with El País in Mexico City. He met with Madero and received a letter to get any data that he requested, but Victoriano Huerta deposed Madero hours after Turner's article appeared. Turner shot photos of Huerta's coup d'etat, but he was arrested. Turner claimed that he was tortured and awaiting execution, but U.S. Secretary of State Philander Knox declared that Turner had never been endangered. Novelist Harry Leon Wilson and poet George Sterling helped bring publicity to Turner's situation through their writing in the newspapers.

=== War correspondent ===
From 1912, the family lived in Carmel-by-the-Sea, where George Sterling let them take over his house. Turner wrote articles for the socialist newspapers the New York Call and Appeal to Reason and other periodicals, covering the labor wars in American coalfields. He posed as a New York magazine writer and exchanged liquor for information with mine guards and militia officers. He traveled to research gunmen corporations hired to stop strikes and labor unions.

A newspaper writer whose work has affected the history of nations, and the author of one book that helped overturn a government. Handles a typewriter harshly, even when composing an advertisement, but smiles nicely upon aspirants for home sites on the Peninsula. Just now a realtor, connected with the Carmel Land Company.

— Carmel Pine Cone

In 1915, Turner traveled to Mexico to report on the American occupation of Veracruz and got an exclusive interview with Venustiano Carranza, one of the constitutionalist revolutionaries' key leaders. He traveled to Mexico again the next year to report on the Pancho Villa Punitive Expedition.

As the guest of a progressive Republican senator from Wisconsin, Robert M. La Follette, Turner was present for President Woodrow Wilson's speech to Congress requesting a declaration of war on Germany. He opposed U.S. participation in the war and in 1922 published Shall It Be Again?, a book criticizing the war and America's involvement, which was cited by, among others, former German Kaiser Wilhelm II in his memoirs on the question of war guilt. After the war, as the prospect of yet another American intervention in Mexico arose, the Rand School of Social Science published his book Hands Off Mexico. In 1921, Turner interviewed the Zapatista General Genovevo de la O in Cuernavaca.

== Later life ==
Political developments in the 1920s and 1930s discouraged Turner and he ceased his writing and political activities. He and Ethel separated in 1925 and he later married socialist writer Adriana Spadoni. In 1941, he published his last book, Challenge to Karl Marx.

Turner died on July 31, 1948.
