= John R. Mosby =

American insurrectionist

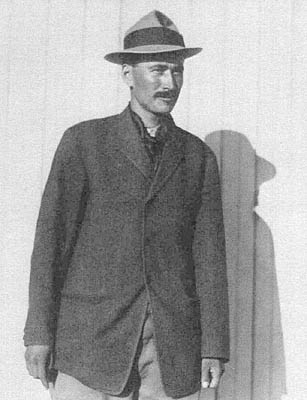
- John R. Mosby in Tijuana, 1911.
- Born: 1877/1878; Kentucky, United States
- Other name: Jack Mosby
- Military career
- Conflicts: Spanish–American War; Second Boer War; Separation of Panama from Colombia; Magonista rebellion

John R. Mosby, aka Jack Mosby, was a member of the Industrial Workers of the World who served as head of the Second Division of the Liberal Army during the Magonista rebellion of 1911 in Baja California.

== Biography ==
John R. Mosby was born in Kentucky, United States, during the late 1870s. His father was N. T. Mosby, an entertainment entrepreneur, and his uncle John S. Mosby was a Colonel in the Confederate Army during the United States Civil War. In his twenties, he became engaged in arms smuggling during the Spanish–American War, acted as a foreign volunteer during the Second Boer War and participated in the rebellion for the separation of Panama from Colombia.

On January 29, 1911, José María Leyva and Simón Berthold took over the border town of Mexicali with a group of approximately 30 rebels. A significant number of new recruits came from American to fight as guerillas in the Liberal Army, many IWW members such as John R. Mosby enlisted, convinced by the revolutionary ideas they shared with the Mexican Liberal Party.

After the deaths of the initial leaders of the campaign, Mosby was elected commander by the so-called "Foreign Legion" or "American Legion". Mosby remained in command until the defeat and surrender of the rebellion in Tijuana on June 22, 1911. He returned to the United States where he was imprisoned on McNeil Island along with other members of the PLM. He was offered his freedom in exchange for testifying against Ricardo Flores Magón, which he refused.

== Bibliography ==
- Taylor Hansen, Lawrence Douglas (2000). "Jack Mosby en la revuelta de 1911 en Baja California" (PDF). Región y Sociedad (20). Colegio de Sonora. Archived from the original (PDF) on October 13, 2007.
