= Hermila Galindo =

Hermila Galindo Acosta
- Born: Hermila Galindo Acosta; 2 June 1886; Villa Lerdo, Durango, Mexico
- Died: 18 August 1954 (aged 68); Mexico City, Mexico
- Other name: Hermila Galindo Acosta de Topete
- Occupations: journalist, activist

Hermila Galindo Acosta (also known as Hermila Galindo de Topete) (2 June 1886 – 18 August 1954) was a Mexican feminist and a writer. She was an early supporter of many radical feminist issues, primarily sex education in schools, women's suffrage, and divorce. She was one of the first feminists to state that Catholicism in Mexico was thwarting feminist efforts, and was the first woman to run for elected office in Mexico.

== Early life ==
Hermila Galindo Acosta was born in Lerdo, Durango, on 2 June 1886 to Rosario Galindo and Hermila Acosta. She began her education in Villa Lerdo and then attended an Industrial School in Chihuahua learning accounting, shorthand, telegraphy, typing, as well as English and Spanish. At the age of 13, she returned home and gave private lessons in shorthand and typing to children. In 1911, she moved to Mexico City.

== Biography ==
Arriving in Mexico City, Galindo joined a liberal club and became a public supporter of Venustiano Carranza, lobbying against Porfirio Díaz. She was discovered by Venustiano Carranza while giving a speech to welcome him upon his return to the capital. He then offered her the opportunity to work with him in Veracruz. She became his private secretary and continued rallying support for the rights of Mexican women and liberal ideologies. Carranza supported her efforts, permitting her to distribute feminist propaganda in the southern Mexican states of Tabasco, Campeche, and Yucatán, and in the traditionally liberal state of Veracruz, as well as Carranza's home state of Coahuila, and San Luis Potosí and Nuevo León. Carranza also appointed her as his representative in Cuba and Colombia, to publicize his policies in surrounding Latin America.

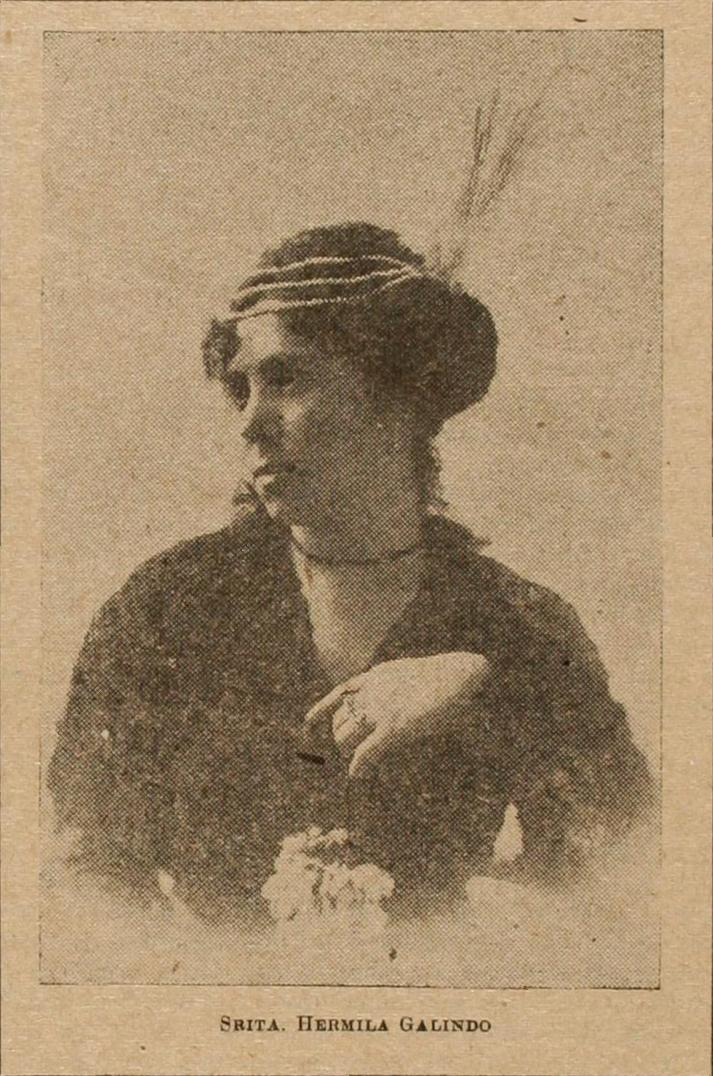
Hermila Galindo, undated photo

In 1915, she created a magazine called La Mujer Moderna ("The Modern Woman"). Along with essays discussing feminist ideas, it served as propaganda to support Carranza. Almost all of her works helped the political campaign of Carranza in some way. The magazine also featured articles which expressed her disapproval of the Catholic Church and its methods of control. She was one of the first feminists to speak out about the church and its view of women. Galindo collaborated with many other journalists and feminists, with the majority of these women being from Spain who were fighting for the same issues as Galindo. The most famous women that stand out from her magazine and articles are María Luisa de la Torre de Otero, Clarisa P. de Torres, Julia D. Febles Cantón Vda. de Palomeque, Micaela Rosado de P., Bolivia M. de Rivas, Rosario Rivas Hernández, María Pacheco, Artemisa N. Sanz Royo, and Luz Calva. Although the magazine was titled La Mujer Moderna, she still included male journalists in her works. She eventually wrote Carranza's biography in addition to at least five other books. One of her books, Un presidenciable: el general Don Pablo Gonzalez, was written about the general Pablo González Garza who was a general during the Mexican Revolution under President Carranza. Her support for Carranza was incredibly obvious because out of all her works were related to him; even the feminist magazine.

At the time her views of sex education and women's sexuality were considered to be extremely radical. Her approach seeking equality and women's rights were seen as controversial. During the First Feminist Congress of Yucatán of 1916, which Galindo did not attend, César González, an education administrator for Carranza, read a statement in which Galindo attacked the male double standard in Mexico. After these statements were read, conservative women's groups went on the defensive and came back with a statement which supported the traditional role of women and opposed women's education.

Carranza allowed Galindo to submit a proposal for women's equality to the Constituent Congress of 1917, but the item was stricken from the final agenda. Her strong support for Carranza was evident in her writings, which expressed her faith in him and his potential to create a social revolution. Through him she believed that women could get the vote and that there was hope for social reform. In the end, Carranza failed to create the change he promised. Instead, because of corruption, he was seen as an enemy of the Revolution, which left Galindo disillusioned.

On 2 March 1917, she took matters into her own hands and filed as a candidate for Deputy of 5th constituency of Mexico City. Gabriela Cano, historian, reported that "it was the first time that, in Mexico, a woman contended as an electoral choice". Though some records show Galindo won a majority of the votes, the Electoral College rejected her results, claiming that they were only complying with the law forbidding women. She accepted the rejection but made it clear that her purpose had been to show publicly that women could be elected and should be allowed to hold public office.

In 1923, Galindo attended a Feminist Congress in the State of Tabasco and organized several revolutionary clubs in Campeche, Tabasco, Veracruz, and Yucatán. She married later that year and ended her political involvement.

She died 18 August 1954 in Mexico City.

== Tribute ==
On 2 June 2018, Galindo was honored by a Google Doodle in Mexico, on her 132nd birthday.

On 20 Nov 2020 Galindo was added to the new Mexican 1000 peso note.

== Selected works ==
- La Mujer moderna (1915–1919) (in Spanish)
- Estudio de la Srita. Hermila Galindo : con motivo de los temas que han de absolverse en el Segundo Congreso Feminista de Yucatán, Noviembre 20 de 1916 (1916) (in Spanish)
- La doctrina Carranza y el acercamiento indo-latino (1919) (in Spanish)
- Un presidenciable: el general Don Pablo Gonzalez (1919) (in Spanish)
- "Mi grano de arena en esa hermosa labor." in La doctrina Carranza y el acercamiento indolatino, pp. 159–67. Mexico 1919.

== See also ==
- Venustiano Carranza
- List of suffragists and suffragettes
- Dolores Jiménez y Muro
- Women in Mexico
