= Second Battle of Tijuana =

Battle of 1911 Mexican Revolution

- Part of the Mexican Revolution
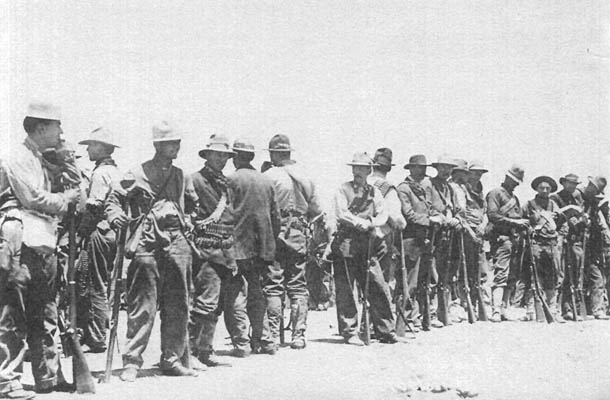
- Magonistas in Tijuana after the first battle at the border town.
Date	June 22, 1911
Location	near Tijuana, Baja California, Mexico
Result	Government victory, federal forces recapture Tijuana.

Belligerents
Liberal Party: Liberal Army	Government: Federal Army

Commanders and leaders
John R. Mosby	Celso Vega

Strength
155 infantry	360 infantry ~200 militia

Casualties and losses
~30 killed	~3 wounded

The Second Battle of Tijuana was fought during the Mexican Revolution in June 1911. The opposing sides were rebel Magonistas and federal Mexican troops of President Francisco León de la Barra with American militia volunteers from Los Angeles, California. Tijuana was retaken by federal forces after a short battle just south of the town.

== Background ==
The Magonista campaign in Baja California began with the Capture of Mexicali on January 29 of 1911. At Mexicali the rebels split their forces in two, half of which marched for Tijuana under General Caryl ap Rhys Pryce. The ultimate goal of the rebel leadership was to capture Ensenada and create a socialist state. Unfortunately for the Magonista cause, their leader Ricardo Flores Magon spent all of his donated revenue on propaganda in Los Angeles instead of using it to supply and arm his rebels. Also, more than half of the Magonistas were Anglo-Americans though the political leaders were Mexicans. The appearance of so many white men in a Mexican rebel army dissuaded the local population of Baja California to support Magon's rebellion.

Ultimately the Magonista's Second Division was not well armed, short on ammunition and reinforcements but also suffered from racial and anti-socialist problems. The First Division in Mexicali surrendered on June 17 to a peace commission authorized by Francisco I. Madero, the rebel ruler but not yet president of Mexico who had just recently defeated the Mexican government forces of President Porfirio Diaz. Thus the rebel troops of Madero were now members of the federal Mexican Army. At this time the Second Division was commanded by former United States Marine General John R. Mosby and consisted of 155 men, many were Industrial Workers of the World members recruited from California. Federal forces under Colonel Celso Vega included 360 infantry along with over 200 armed Mexican volunteers. They arrived at Ensenada by ship and joined Colonel Vega before marching north towards Tijuana. With the federal force was six machine guns and some artillery.

Learning of the landing, John Mosby marched his men and met up with Vega's force just south of Tijuana on June 22, 1911.

== Battle ==
After reports of sightings of Vega's men in the hills to the east of Tijuana, John R. Mosby ordered his division to attack. As most of the rebel troops were on foot, the movement was accomplished primarily using a work train, led by SD&A #50, a Baldwin 2-8-0 steam locomotive commandeered from the San Diego & Arizona Railway. This strategy was failed as the out numbered rebels were poorly protected as the federals began pouring machine-gun and artillery fire from elevated positions. The federals stayed out of close range until the end of the battle, meaning that the combat was a primarily long distance engagement until the last few minutes. General Mosby's force was routed after a large federal assault on his flanks. American Magonistas fled north to the USA border, some by train, and at 1 PM surrendered unconditional to Captain Evans of the United States Army in SD&A caboose #400, which was positioned on the border to facilitate the surrender. The Mexican Magonista division, which included some native Americans, slipped away into the surrounding countryside. Contemporary reports of the fatalities differ with some claiming only a few federal troops were wounded and other US papers suggesting it was as many as 25 killed and 50 wounded. The Magonistas suffered over thirty dead, most of whom were left on the battlefield when the Magonistas retreated.

== Aftermath ==
The Ensenada Campaign ended with the second battle south of Tijuana, which also ended the rebellion. Ricardo Flores Magon was arrested in 1918 and imprisoned in Leavenworth Penitentiary, where he died in 1922 under mysterious circumstances. Today Magon is remembered as a hero in Mexico. Only occasional raids were conducted by Anglo Magonistas after this battle, all were launched from within California and ceased by 1915. In response to the rebel activity along the border, the Mexican government built Fort Tijuana, a large square walled structure built in the traditional fortress style.

== See also ==
- Magonism
- Magonista rebellion of 1911
- Mexican Expedition
