= Magon (musician) =

Israeli musical artist

Magon מגון
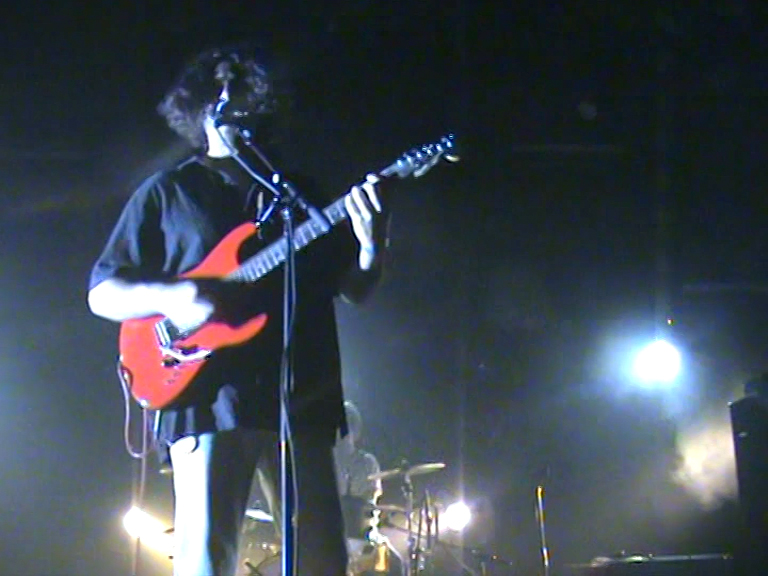
- Magon live in Paris, 2019

Background information
- Born: Alon Magen; May 8, 1985 (age 41)
- Genres: Rock, post-punk, psychedelic rock
- Instruments: Guitar, bass,
- Years active: 2018–present
- Labels: December Square, Howlin Banana Records
- Website: magon.me

Alon Magen (Hebrew: אלון מגן; born May 8, 1985), known professionally as Magon is an Israeli singer-songwriter and producer.

== Biography ==
=== Early Career and Paris Years (2015–2021) ===
Based in Paris since 2009, Magon released his debut album, Out in the Dark (2019), which received positive reviews from the French press. His work has drawn attention in prominent publications such as Rolling Stone, Rock & Folk, and France Culture, reflecting his influence on the alternative music scene. He followed up with Hour After Hour (2021), praised for its atmospheric sound and polished production. His album In the Blue (2021) marked a shift toward intimate acoustic arrangements and received acclaim from outlets such as Rock & Folk (which awarded it 4 out of 4 stars). A Night in Bethlehem (2022) further integrated acoustic elements with personal storytelling, while Enter by the Narrow Gate (2022)—recorded in Paris shortly before his relocation—explored introspective and spiritual themes.

=== Paris and Costa Rica Years, Evolving Sound (2022 to Present) ===
After relocating to Costa Rica in 2022, Magon entered a prolific phase. The album Did You Hear the Kids? (2023) showcased a mature, experimental sound and was discussed in both French and Spanish press. Chasing Dreams... (2023) further explored personal fulfillment and artistic growth and featured collaborations with the Costa Rican indie rock band Las Robertas. The Writing’s On the Wall (2024) delved into introspection with a blend of folk and psychedelic elements, while Wedding Song (2024) offered a reflective look at love and commitment. World Peace (2024) addressed themes of global unity through psychedelic reinterpretations, and Tales of a Mountain Child (2025) marked a return to rock roots with garage and freewheeling grooves reflecting on childhood and nature.

== Discography ==
=== Albums ===
- 2019: Out in the Dark
- 2021: Hour After Hour
- 2021: In The Blue
- 2022: A Night in Bethlehem
- 2022: Enter by the Narrow Gate
- 2023: Did You Hear The Kids?
- 2023: Chasing Dreams…
- 2024: The Writing’s On The Wall
- 2024: Wedding Song
- 2024: World Peace
- 2025: Tales of a Mountain Child
