= Capture of Mexicali =

1911 battle of the Mexican Revolution

- Part of the Mexican Revolution
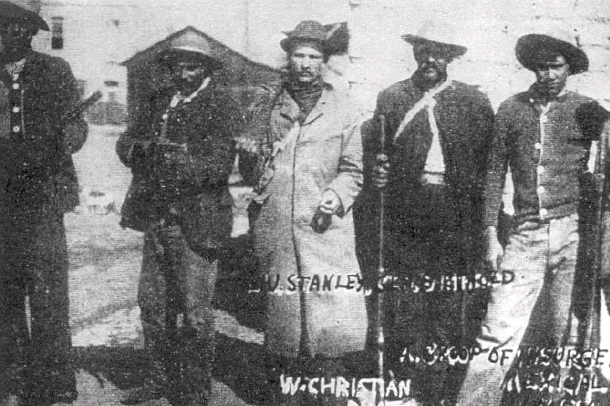
- Simon Berthold (center) and other Magonistas after capturing Mexicali.
Date	29 January 1911
Location	Mexicali, Baja California, Mexico 32°39′48″N 115°28′04″W
Result	Magonista victory, rebel forces capture Mexicali.

Belligerents
Liberal Party: Liberal Army	Government: Federal Army

Commanders and leaders
José María Leyva	Unknown

Strength
18 infantry	10 policemen

Casualties and losses
None	1 killed 12 captured

The Capture of Mexicali, or the Battle of Mexicali, was the first action of the Mexican Revolution taken by rebel Magonistas against the federal government of Porfirio Díaz. Under the direction of Ricardo Flores Magón, a group of rebels captured the border town of Mexicali, Baja California, with little resistance.

== Background ==
Ricardo Flores Magón and his brother Enrique had a long history of anti-government and pro-socialist incidents before beginning the revolt of 1911. Flores Magón, who was the leader of the Partido Liberal Mexicano (PLM) in Los Angeles, chose early 1911 as the time to begin an insurrection. All across Mexico, revolution was breaking out and the Federal Army was losing the fight. The PLM junta in California chose the small border town of Mexicali for taking. Access to the border would allow PLM forces to more easily recruit U.S. volunteers and resupply their forces.

The junta appointed the gunsmith José María Leyva to command the Magonista force of seventeen other men. Leyva had been in the 1906 strike at Cananea and was a strong anti-government protester. A half Mexican and half German socialist named Simon Berthold was second in command. Other reasons for the choosing of Mexicali was due to its strategic location; far from Mexico City and large bodies of federal troops. The Magonistas also hoped to capture the revenue collected by Mexican customs agents in the town.

== Capture ==
At dawn on 29 January, the eighteen Magonistas were led by Leyva across the border into California; there, just across the international line the Magonistas found an arms cache and stocked themselves with about sixty rifles, some pistols, and several thousand rounds of ammunition. They then headed back across the border the outskirts of Mexicali and divided into three groups. The rebels then readied their weapons and attacked. The first group was led by Berthold who stormed the custom house and captured the two sleeping officers.

The second group headed for the home of the chief of police and quickly took command of the structure and the chief. The third force under José Leyva attacked the jail house where the only shot of the engagement was fired. jailer José Villanova refused to give the rebels the keys to the jail cells. He was shot dead after cocking his pistol behind the door of his office, the Magonistas heard the cock and fired into the building. Ten Mexican policemen were captured at the jail. Villanova became the only casualty of the operation. After capturing the jail the event was over, the prisoners were freed and nine of them joined the Magonsitas.

== Aftermath ==
The two customs officers paid the Magonistas $385 for their freedom and were released into California. Of the ten captured policemen, seven were freed and ran across the border into California with only their underwear. After the capture of Mexicali, the Magonista force quickly grew from eighteen to almost 500 men, of which approximately 100 were Americans, including the wobblies Frank Little and Joe Hill. The Magonista Campaign began at Mexicali, from there the rebels marched on and captured Tijuana on 9 May before being defeated just south of the town during another engagement.

Defeated, the rebels held no more territory and disbanded or escaped into California.

== See also ==
- Magonism
- Magonista rebellion of 1911
- Mexican Expedition
- Mexican Liberal Party

== Sources ==
- Cornelius Smith, Emilio Kosterlitzky, Eagle of Sonora (1970)
- Trimble, Marshall, (1998), Arizona, A Cavalcade of History, Treasure Chest Publications, Tucson, Arizona ISBN 0-918080-43-6
