= Práxedis G. Guerrero Municipality =

Municipality in the Mexican state of Chihuahua

Práxedis G. Guerrero
- Municipality
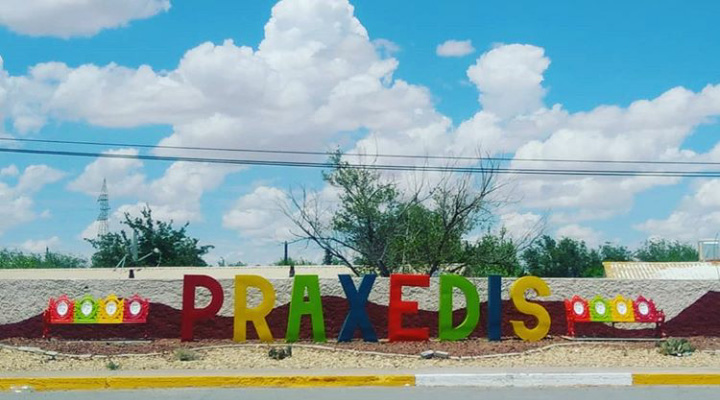

- Municipality of Práxedis G. Guerrero in Chihuahua

- Location in Mexico
- Coordinates: 31°22′N 106°18′W
- Country: Mexico
- State: Chihuahua
- Municipal seat: Práxedis Gilberto Guerrero
- Municipality created: 15 February 1859
- Municipality dissolved: 1893
- Municipality restored: February 1922

Area
  - Total: 808.97 km^{2} (312.35 sq mi)

Population (2010)
  - Total: 4,799
- Postal code: 32780
- Area code: 656
- Website: http://www.mpiopraxedisguerrero.gob.mx

Práxedis G. Guerrero is one of the 67 municipalities of Chihuahua, in northern Mexico. The municipal seat lies at Práxedis G. Guerrero, Chihuahua. The municipality covers an area of 808.97 km^{2} and stands on the US border close to Ciudad Juárez.

== Name ==
The municipality's name was given to it by the State Congress in December 1933, to honor the Revolutionary leader Práxedis G. Guerrero, who was killed in action in Janos, Chihuahua, on 30 December 1910. It was previously known as San Ignacio.

== History ==
Originally San Ignacio or San Ignacio de Loyola, founded after the Guadalupe/Hidalgo Treaty by missionaries coming from central north east Nuevo Mejico, later known as New Mexico.

== Demographics ==
As of 2010, the municipality had a total population of 4,799, dramatically down from 8,514 as of 2005.

As of 2010, the town of Práxedis G. Guerrero had a population of 2,128. Other than the town of Práxedis G. Guerrero, the municipality had 85 localities, the largest of which (with 2010 population in parentheses) was: El Porvenir (1,253), classified as rural.

Práxedis G. Guerrero has a very low population that rarely grows. In fact, much of the population, above all those of school age, leave for nearby Ciudad Juárez, due to the higher level of economic activity there.

== Geography ==
=== Towns and villages ===
The municipality has 27 localities. The largest are:

Name	2010 Census Population
Práxedis G. Guerrero	2,128
El Porvenir	1,253
Colonia Esperanza	710
Total Municipality	4,799

=== Adjacent municipalities and counties ===
- Guadalupe Municipality - east, south, and west
- Hudspeth County, Texas - north and northeast

=== Climate and ecology ===
The climate is extremely arid, with very high temperatures in the summer and very low temperatures in the winter, with extreme recorded temperatures of 43°C and -23°C. It has very low levels of precipitation.

Its flora are plants typical of the desert, and its fauna includes species such as the puma and the coyote.

== Politics ==
=== Municipal presidents ===
- 1998–2001: Diego Javier Cedillos Aguirre
- 2001–2004: Rafael Carreón González
- 2004–2007: Juvenal Rodela Campos

In 2010 20-year-old Marisol Valles García, a criminology student, became the municipality's main chief of police. As of that year the police department consisted of 13 members, mostly women, who are unarmed. She was the only person to apply for the job.

By some point in 2011, Valles fled with her family across the border, into the United States, to formally declare asylum.
