= Neutrality Act of 1818 =

- Long title: An Act in addition to the “Act for the punishment of certain crimes against the United States,” and to repeal the acts therein mentioned.
- Enacted by: the 15th United States Congress
- Effective: June 5, 1794

Citations
- Public law: Pub. L. 15–88
- Statutes at Large: 3 Stat. 447

Legislative history
- Signed into law by President James Monroe on April 20, 1818

The Neutrality Act of 1818 was a United States law that repealed and replaced the Neutrality Act of 1794 and Neutrality Act 1817. The Act largely amended the previous two acts by repealing and replacing such Acts instead of directly amending the two Acts.

== Evolution ==
The Neutrality Act of 1818 was updated in 1838 during the 1837 Rebellions in Canada.

The Neutrality Act of 1818 was eventually codified as 18 U.S.C. § 956 et seq., including 18 U.S.C. § 960, among other sections.

== Recent applications ==
In 1981, nine men involved in Operation Red Dog were sentenced to three years in prison pursuant to the successor statute of the Neutrality Act of 1818; they had planned to overthrow the government of Dominica.

In the 2007 Laotian coup d'état conspiracy allegation, the United States government alleged after a sting operation that a group of conspirators planned to violate the successor statute of the Neutrality Act of 1818 by overthrowing the government of Communist Laos. The United States Government has since dropped all charges against these defendants.

In May 2016 four United States residents were convicted of violating the successor statute of the Neutrality Act of 1818 for their role in the 2014 Gambian coup d'état attempt. They were each sentenced to 6-12 months in prison respectively.
