= Andrea Villarreal =

Mexican feminist revolutionary (1881–1963)

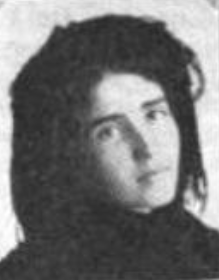
- Andrea Villarreal González, 1909
- Died: 1963 (aged 81–82)

Andrea Villarreal (Lampazos, 1881 – Monterrey, 1963) was a Mexican revolutionary, journalist and feminist. She was most known for her work with the Regeneración newspaper and La Mujer Moderna.

== Biography ==
Andrea was born in January 1881 in Lampazos, Nuevo León , Mexico into a progressive family. Her father, Próspero Villarreal Zuazua, was mayor of the town Lampazos in 1876, and spearheaded the Lampazos Workers Union in 1887. Andrea and her four siblings Antonio Irineo, Teresa, Próspero and Alfonso were exposed early on to the social issues in their town. This led to the development of their own politically active lifestyles. Andrea gave her vocal support to the anarchist and communist Partido Liberal Mexicano (PLM) opposing the dictatorship of President Porfirio Díaz (1876–1911), during the Mexican Revolution of 1910–1917. The political circumstances in Mexico forced her family to flee to the United States.

The family’s exile from the country did not spare them from the dictator's repression. Diaz continued to pursue Antonio along with other PLM revolutionist leaders that had fled to the US. In 1907, Antonio, Librado Ricardo, and Ricardo Flores Magon were captured and held in the Los Angeles, California jail for 18 months. During this time Andrea and her sister Teresa continued to act as supporters for the movement.

== Revolutionary work ==
The revolution was a gateway for women to write and edit their own works. Andrea along with other women such as Blanca Moncaleano, Teresa Arteaga, and Maria Talavera played key roles in the revolution when leaders of the PLM were arrested. These women openly criticized Diaz while pushing their Chicana feminist agendas. Together they challenged stereotypes of women about gender, class, race, sexuality and equality overall. Often referred to as the Joan of Arc of the Mexican revolution, Villarreal began her work against Diaz in 1903 when she was still located in Lampazos. Andrea wrote for Spanish-language newspapers Reforma, Libertad y Justicia, Regeneración, and La Estrella. In San Antonio the Villarreal sisters published two newspapers the feminist newspaper La Mujer Moderna (The Modern Woman, 1910) and the revolutionary El Obrero (The Worker).

La Mujer Moderna was published monthly by Andrea costing 60 cents in the US and $1.25 silver in Mexico, while El Obrero was published biweekly by Teresa costing $1 in the US and the equivalent in Mexican currency. Both papers were dedicated to the evolution of women, rights of the oppressed and Mexican migrants in the US. In addition to her presence in the combat newspapers, Andrea spearheaded the production of revolutionary postcards. Advertised through the Regeneracion, Andrea composed postcards about the revolution including portraits of revolutionaries that confronted the Diaz tyranny.

== Journalistic work ==
In the September 12, 1910, issue of La Regeneración Andrea and Teresa published a piece calling men to action “Que Hacéis Aquí Hombres?” or “What Are You Doing Here Men?, Fly, Fly to the Battlefield”. In the article they emphasize that women have shouldered the adversities of the revolution and that they deserve to voice their call to action on all men. The sisters attest to the courage of the Mexican men who are fighting against the Diaz rule and then call on men, especially those men in the US with access to firearms, to join these rebel forces on Mexican soil. The Villarreals use bold statements about bravery, cowardliness, and rightful duty to challenge the Mexican men who choose to act as bystanders. In the end, they claim that a win on the battlefield translates to their freedom and that death is still a “symbol of glory”.

When PLM Vice President Juan Sarabia was kidnapped by US agents and delivered to the Mexican government, Ricardo Flores Magón wrote a letter to Porfirio Díaz stating that "If Sarabia dies in jail, we will kill you." Villarreal corroborated this message in the local St. Louis Press, stating that “If Juan Sarabia perish [sic], the Liberal Party will kill Díaz.”

In the Regeneracion postcards she published many short poems that depicted the fearless fighters of the revolution. One short poem that was recovered, “Puebla”, spoke about the “luchadores da raca Azteca”, Aztec fighters. Andrea praises their heroics and bravery, and claims that it is better to give your life in war than prolong the state of slavery they suffer under Diaz.

== Death ==
She returned to Mexico after the fall of Diaz and died in a military hospital in Monterrey in 1963. Despite its merit, Andreas contributions have been forgotten like many other women’s revolutionary work.
