= La Mujer Moderna =

Mexican weekly feminist magazine

La Mujer Moderna was a Mexican weekly feminist magazine founded by Hermila Galindo and published between 1915 and 1919. Between September 16, 1915 and September 16, 1919, 102 issues were published in México City, México. The magazine had weekly, then monthly publications. The name La Mujer Moderna was changed to Mujer Moderna as time progressed .La Mujer Moderna aimed to advance women’s suffrage, promoting constitutionalism, political participation in the Mexican Revolution, and re-defining conditions for women in society. This newspaper promoted women's rights throughout the early 1900s.

== Historic context ==
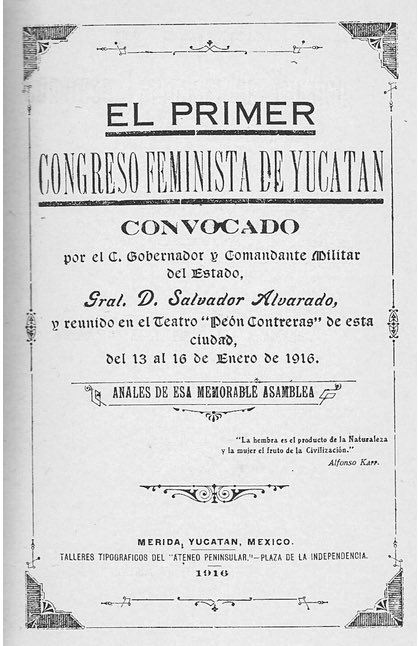
Invitation to attend the First Feminist Congress of Yucatan in 1916. It was published in Merida, Yucatan, Mexico, in 1916

The Mexican Revolution(1910-1917) marked the establishment of the Mexican Revolutionary Party, while dismantling the Oligarchy, a state that favored wealthy classes, particularly, industrialists. This change incorporated middle and working classes in economic concerns. During the Mexican Revolution, feminism shifted, by focusing on increasing political participation and involvement of women in war efforts, challenging Victorian morality. Soldaderas, women who participated in revolutionary efforts, took on roles as spies, commanders, cooks, and nurses. Their participation marked the mobility of women outside of the private sphere within their homes, and introduced feminist ideals surrounding the re-definition of womanhood. Women such as Hermila Galindo used their writings to express their feminist views as well. In La Mujer Moderna, Galindo had a strategy to her writings regarding advocating for feminist views by blurring nationalist issues with those of a feminist agenda. Galindo's writings in La Mujer Moderna had a strong connection between the emancipation of Mexico and the redemption of women, and Galindo is noted for having a dual rhetoric in her attempt to advocate for women. Opponents of feminism believed that if women were granted basic rights and spaces within society, they would move away from their role within the domestic sphere, since feminism “masculinizes women”. Galindo oftentimes used the verb manumit, the release from slavery, when talking about the conditions of Mexican women in the 1900s. This positions women in the role of domestic slaves and their emancipation was tied to granting them rights in society, including suffrage. Women in the Mexican Revolution were publishing journals and articles, but their feminism was tied to men advocating against the Porfiriato.

== Hermila Galindo ==
After Galindo’s father died, she began working out of economic necessity, and immersed herself in political involvement when she moved back to her birthplace of Durango, Mexico. She was a part of Venustiano Carranza’s Constitutionalist movement and advocated to defend national sovereignty. She started as a representative for the Constitutionalist party that would host meetings and present speeches to mobilize groups. Throughout this time, Galindo sustained a close relationship with Carranza, as his colleague and confidant. Her commitment to the Constitutionalist party and feminist ideals led her to found and direct La Mujer Moderna on September 16, 1915.

== Dialogue Surrounding Women's Suffrage ==
Galindo, an activist for women’s suffrage, was vocal about this topic during the First Feminist Congress of Yucatan in 1916. The Congress took place in Yucatan because of Galindo’s relationship with Salvador Alvarado, member of the Constitutionalist party. There, Galindo, Edelmira Trejo de Meillon, and Elvia Carillo Puerto, proponents of suffrage, expressed that women deserved to vote in order to defend the interests of humanity, the homeland, and their children, in a different way that a man could not. Galindo expressed the same sentiment in the piece titled “Why Women Should Vote”. within La Mujer Moderna. At the time, Inés Malváez, major opponent of women's suffrage, argued that suffrage would distract women from fulfilling their duties within the home. Galindo references the laws in Colorado and Massachusetts that gave mothers the same rights over their children that their husbands had in the context of separation and divorce. The piece also cites the gender wage gap, and the increase in proportion of educated voters as motives behind granting women the right to vote.

== Redefining Womanhood ==
The contributors of La Mujer Moderna critically analyzed topics concerning women including: reproductive rights, divorce, the importance of education, and societal beauty standards. Galindo was a key leader in the Constitutionalists efforts that made divorce legal, granted women custody of their children, gave women the right to own property and engage in legal action Additionally, she was a proponent of sexual education that believed women deserved to understand the anatomy, and physiology behind sexual drives and desire. She outlined the gendered consequences of sexual intercourse, where women are to care for their children after they become pregnant, while men have the mobility to evade these responsibilities. Similarly, Refugio Garcia de Espejo's piece “La Mujer Moderna” calls on young women to redefine the standards for "mujeres modernas", modern women. She advises women to challenge the intellectual oppression they were enduring. She calls on “Mexican women” to seek a deeper understanding, engage in poetry, and pursue a radical education. Additionally, Carmen's piece "La Belleza", criticized the fluctuating standards of beauty that women are pressured to uphold, as it is their "capital".

== End of La Mujer Moderna ==
The last issue, number 102, of La Mujer Moderna was published in September 1919, in México City, México. Galindo's role as an author of books centered around Carranza's doctrine and Pablo Gonzalez' candidacy influenced the conclusion of La Mujer Moderna.
