= Práxedis Gilberto Guerrero, Chihuahua =

Town in Chihuahua, Mexico

Práxedis Gilberto Guerrero
- Town
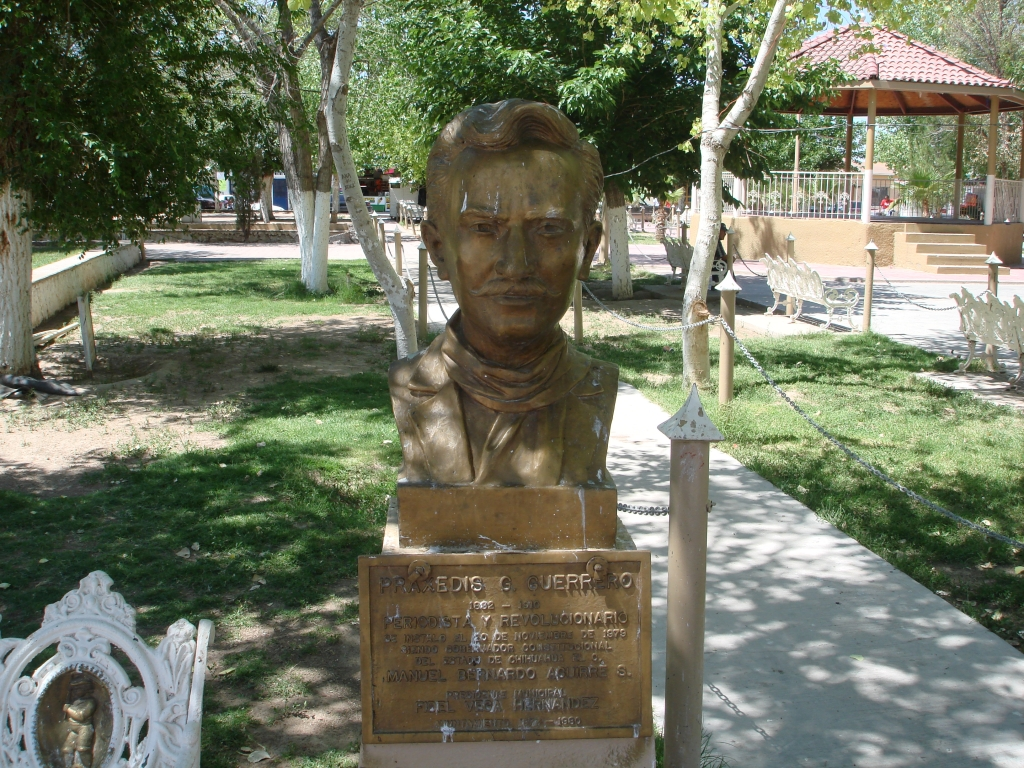
- Bust of the town's namesake in the central plaza

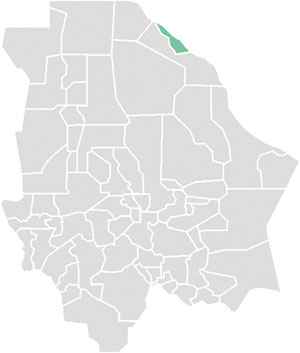
- Municipality of Práxedis G. Guerrero in Chihuahua

- Location in Mexico
- Coordinates: 31°22′22″N 106°00′20″W
- Country: Mexico
- State: Chihuahua
- Municipality: Práxedis G. Guerrero
- Founded: 1849

Area
  - Total: 808.97 km^{2} (312.35 sq mi)
- Elevation: 1,100 m (3,600 ft)

Population (2010)
  - Total: 2,128
- Postal code: 32780
- Area code: 656
- Website: http://www.mpiopraxedisguerrero.gob.mx

Práxedis Gilberto Guerrero is the municipal seat of the municipality of Práxedis G. Guerrero in the northern Mexican state of Chihuahua.

In the 2005 Census, the town reported a population of 3,431. Only five years later, at the 2010 census, the population had declined dramatically to 2,128 inhabitants.

== History ==
The town was founded in 1849, as San Ignacio, by the priest Ramón Ortiz y Miera. The original settlers were a group of people from Texas and New Mexico, who did not wish to remain in the United States following the cession of those territories under the 1848 Treaty of Guadalupe Hidalgo.

Its current name was given to it by the State Congress in December 1983, to honour the Revolutionary leader Práxedis G. Guerrero, who was killed in action in Janos, Chihuahua, on 30 December 1910.
