= Ethel Duffy Turner =

American journalist and writer (1885–1969)

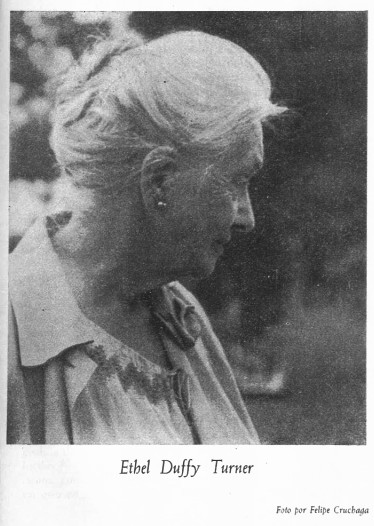
Ethel Duffy Turner

Ethel Evelyn Duffy Turner (1885 San Pablo – 1969 Cuernavaca) was an American journalist and writer. She was a witness to the events of the Mexican Revolution. She is known for her book Ricardo Flores Magón and the Mexican Liberal Party.

== Career ==
In 1909, she wrote for The Border, in Tucson, financed by Elizabeth Trowbridge. Under the guise of a magazine dedicated to the border culture of Arizona, it also campaigned in defense of the Mexican Liberal Party (PLM) members imprisoned in the United States and against the social situation in Mexico during the regime. by Porfirio Díaz.

Duffy Turner was an anarchist. She helped organize the Magonista party in Los Angeles. She knew Antonio Villa-Real, Librado Rivera. Magonist meetings were held at the Turners' own Los Angeles apartment. She edited the Regeneration English pages.

Her papers are held at the University of California, Berkeley.

== Personal life ==
She married John Kenneth Turner in 1905 in Fresno, CA. They met at the University of California, where Ethel was a 3rd year student, and John was a "special student". They had a daughter in 1909 named Juanita. Ethel and John divorced in 1917, and Ethel never remarried.

== Works ==
- Ethel Duffy Turner; Eduardo Limón G Ricardo Flores Magón y el Partido Liberal Mexicano Morelia: Editorial Erandi del Gobierno del Estado, 1960
- Ethel Duffy Turner; Rey Devis Revolution in Baja California: Ricardo Flores Magon's High Noon Detroit, Mich. : Blaine Ethridge—Books, 1981. ISBN 9780879170783
- Ethel Duffy Turner; One Way Ticket, Published by Smiths & Haas, January 1934
