= Enrique Flores Magón =

Mexican journalist and politician (1877–1954)

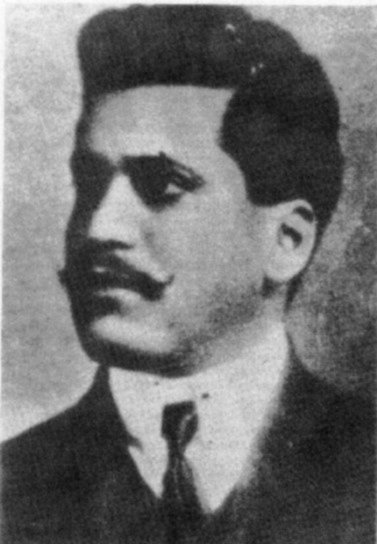
- Born: 13 April 1877; Teotitlán del Camino, Oaxaca
- Died: 28 October 1954 (aged 77); Mexico City

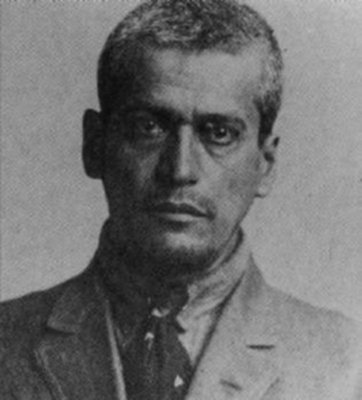
Enrique Flores Magón in 1918

Enrique Flores Magón (Note: In this Mexican name, the surname is Flores and the second or maternal family name is Magón.) (13 April 1877 – 28 October 1954) was a Mexican journalist and politician, associated with the Mexican Liberal Party and anarchism. His name is most frequently linked with that of his elder brother, Ricardo Flores Magón, and the political philosophy they espoused, magonismo. Another brother was Jesús Flores Magón.

== Biography ==
Flores Magón was born in Teotitlán del Camino (since renamed Teotitlán de Flores Magón) in the state of Oaxaca on 13 April 1877, to Margarita Magón and Teodoro Flores, a Nahua who had fought in Benito Juárez's Liberal Army. At an early age the family relocated to Mexico City. He was a student in the capital in 1884 when demonstrations broke out against the third re-election of President Porfirio Díaz. By 1902, he and his brother Ricardo, working on the anti-Díaz broadsheet El Hijo del Ahuizote, were arrested and incarcerated in the military prison at Santiago Tlatelolco. While in prison the brothers explored the ideas of writers such as Kropotkin, Faure, Errico Malatesta, Maxim Gorki, and Proudhon and discussed the possibility of disseminating anarchist ideas in Mexico.

Upon their release from prison in January 1903, the brothers returned to publishing El Hijo del Ahuizote and, on 5 February of that year, Enrique Flores Magón drew a banner declaring "The Constitution is Dead", which they hung in front of its offices.

On 2 April 1903, they and other liberals stormed a pro-Díaz demonstration and succeeded in turning it into an anti-Díaz event, calling for the dictator's death. On 11 April, Flores Magón was arrested again; he was later released, but subject to a ban on publishing any written materials. As a result, Enrique and Ricardo left Mexico for the United States, arriving in Laredo, Texas, in late 1903.

Enrique lived in several cities around the U.S. and Canada, concealing his identity, constantly changing address, and frequently losing contact with Ricardo. In St. Louis, he helped draft the platform of the Mexican Liberal Party (PLM).

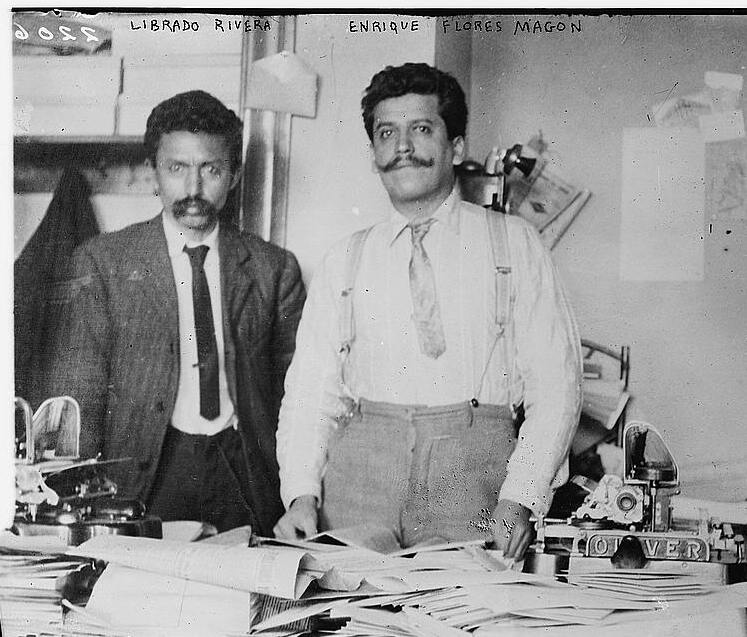
Librado Rivera and Enrique Flores Magón

He recommenced publication in the United States of the newspaper Regeneración, which the brothers had founded in 1900, and organized a clandestine network for its distribution in Mexico. He continued in these endeavors until 1917, when he left the Organizing Committee of the PLM and the Regeneración editorial team.

Following Ricardo's death in 1922, he returned to Mexico in 1923, where he had a series of disagreements with former Magonistas. In 1933, he helped leaders of the National Agrarian League found the Confederación Campesina Mexicana in San Luis Potosí.

He died in Mexico City on 28 October 1954, aged 77.

== See also ==
- Magonism
