= Caryl Ap Rhys Pryce =

British mercenary

Caryl ap Rhys Pryce
- Born: 30 September 1876; Vizianagaram, British India
- Died: 26 November 1955 (aged 79); Cockermouth
- Spouse: Ellen Mary Wilkinson
- Military career
- Allegiance: Soldier of fortune
- Branch: Mexican Foreign Legion
- Rank: Lieutenant
- Commands: 'A' Battery, 119th Field Artillery Brigade
- Conflicts: Second Matabele War Second Boer War Mexican Revolution First World War
- Awards: Distinguished Service Order, 1917

Caryl ap Rhys Pryce DSO (30 September 1876 – 26 November 1955) was a Welshman and soldier of fortune most noted for his role in the 1911 Magonista rebellion in Baja California, Mexico.

He was born on 30 September 1876, in Vizianagaram, Andhra Pradesh, British India, the son of Lt.-Col. Douglas Davidson Pryce and Georgie Hunter Carter. He was the younger brother of General Sir Henry ap Rhys Pryce.

Pryce took over the command of the Mexican foreign legion in the rebellion after the slaying of its previous commander Stanley Williams. Pryce forced the property owners of the Mexicali region to contribute to his army's operations. On 9 May 1911 Pryce and his soldiers took control of Tijuana in a battle with Government Troops. Here he also instituted a regime of taxes and customs duties. With the resignation of Porfirio Díaz as president of Mexico, Pryce resigned his command of the foreign legion in the face of Ricardo Flores Magón's refusal to accept the Treaty of Ciudad Juárez.

Pryce was a direct descendant of the Welsh freedom fighter Owain Glyndŵr.

== Africa and Boer War ==
Pryce fought in the Second Matabele War with the British South Africa Police enlisting in May 1897 under the command of R.C. Nesbitt V.C. He joined D Troop of the Mashontaland Division, participating in the storming of Matshayongombi's stronghold, where dynamite was used to blow the rebels out of their fortified caverns. Over the course of four days, 278 rebels surrendered, but hundreds more were entombed within the rock. Shortly afterwards, Pryce obtained a prospecting licence from the Mining Commissioner at Umtali, but his ten claims in Manica country proved fruitless.

In the Second Boer War, he distinguished himself as an outstanding marksman, regularly stalking and engaging Boer positions. Pryce enlisted in the Natal Mounted Police at Pietermaritzburg in May 1898. Active service ensued in the Boer War, including six months in the Imperial Light Horse in 1900, prior to employment in the South African Constabulary later that year. Commissioned as a 2nd Lieutenant in January 1903, he went on to serve as District Commandant of Bethlem, Springfontein, Flicksburg and Jacobsdal, in which period he also acted as Magistrate.

== Gringo revolutionary ==
In 1908, he joined the 6th Duke of Connaught's Own Rifles, the local militia unit. But with business slack, and in fear of being hitched by the lady in his life, Pryce made a typically spur of the moment decision - whilst walking late one night he happened upon the ferry to Los Angeles, and without further thought or telling anybody of his intentions he jumped aboard. Arriving in L.A. in January 1911, without a penny to his name, his prospects looked bleak, the local populace suffering from high unemployment.

Yet Pryce's arrival in Los Angeles happened to coincide with the heightened activity of Ricardo Flores Magon, an exiled Mexican revolutionary with ambitions towards ousting his country's president, Porfirio Díaz - the latter had been in power for 30 years and was under increasing pressure by another revolutionary called Madero, whose "Generals" were to later be Pancho Villa and Emiliano Zapata.

Magon was constantly watched by both U.S. and Mexican agents, and, though fearful of being extradited back to his homeland to face the firing squad, plotted a revolution in Baja California, right on the American border - being based in L.A., he was able to take advantage of the down trodden masses and enlist their support as a vanguard of socialist revolution. And what he got by way of volunteers was a very mixed bag indeed, comprising 'U.S. Army deserters, border bandits, escaped convicts, mercenaries, and most of all Caryl ap Rhys Pryce' (Gringo Revolutionary, The Amazing Adventures of Caryl Ap Rhys Pryce, by J. Humphries, refers), the latter no doubt attracted by a bounty of $100 and a salary of a dollar a day - not to mention the promise of 160 acres of free land in Baja California, if Magon's aims were achieved.

Among a party of 18 volunteers, Pryce was guided across the border into Mexico by Generalissimo Jose Maria Leyva, and his second in command, Simon Berthold, his fellow mercenaries including another Boer War veteran, "Melbourne" Hopkins from Australia, and several U.S. Army deserters, most prominent of which was to become Stanley Williams. Poorly armed, the budding revolutionaries joined up with a party of Indians, 'the only thing distinguishing them as an army, the anarchist emblem, tiny red bows, pinned to their sleeves' (Humphries).

In late January 1911, Leyva took the border town of Mexicali without any great resistance and enrolled prisoners from the local jail to boost his force, news that Magon was able to use to his advantage back in L.A. where more volunteers came forward, but given the proximity of Mexicali to the U.S. border, it was inevitable that Washington became involved, a request being sent to President Diaz to deal with the 'uprising'. In answer to this request, the State Governor, Colonel Celso Vega, accompanied by 100 police, set off on a 10-day forced march across the mountains to Mexicali. Exhausted by the march, his small force was ill-prepared to take on the entrenched "Magonistas", and after a two-hour pitched battle in which several men were killed, the Mexican force fled, carrying the wounded Vega with them.

The military knowledge of the veterans had come to the fore, leading to Stanley Williams taking command of the Magonistas and he 'wasted no time stamping his new authority on the rebel army. Declaring he wanted action quickly, he, Pryce and Hopkins, together with 40 other gringos, hijacked a train to raid Algodones about 30 miles down the line towards Arizona. Bridges were blown, telegraph lines cut, and the terrified inhabitants sent fleeing across the border' (Humphries).

The ongoing raids on cattle, and other activities, caused extreme discomfort amongst the wealthy American land owners in the Imperial Valley, which in turn put further pressure on Washington and, ultimately, President Diaz, to do something.

The answer came on 6 March when, as recounted by Humphries, 'the War Department announced the largest mobilisation of troops and naval vessels ever undertaken by the United States in peacetime. Twenty thousand soldiers, a fifth of the U.S. Army, together with most of the Pacific Fleet, 2,000 marines recalled from their base at Guantanamo in Cuba, were converging on the border with Mexico.' The relative stability of Diaz's reign had been good for the U.S's $1 billion investment in Mexico, but the pressure placed on that stability by the Magonistas camped closely to their border was clearly trying their diplomatic patience.

On 8 April, Colonel Mayol and 600 regular soldiers of the Mexican "Fighting Eighth", with artillery support, advanced to within five miles of Mexicali. Williams and Pryce rode out to meet them with what has been called the 2nd Battalion of the Liberal Army in Lower California, better known as the "Foreign Legion" - a force of 80 men, only 30 of whom were mounted - and they were ambushed in an open cornfield on John Little's Ranch by Mexican machine-guns and artillery pieces. Humphries takes up the story: Shells screamed overhead, kicking up great clouds of dust and sand, the Magonistas diving for cover in the craters gouged in the desert floor. Pinned down by two chattering Hotchkisses, with Williams dying at his side, part of his head blown off ... Pryce sent "Dynamite" Bill, the oldest man in the 2nd Battalion, to attack the machine-guns with his home-made bombs ... Crawling to the edge of the Encina Canal, he lit the fuses from the end of his cigar, lobbing his bombs at the enemy ... Convinced the insurrectos had artillery, the Mexicans did pull back for a time.'

In fact, one of Bill's bombs took out a machine-gun and Pryce and some of his comrades were able to make their escape, but not before noting that the Mexicans were in no mood to take prisoners, bayoneting their wounded where they fell in the cornfield. By now, to the 40 or so surviving Magonistas, states Humphries, Pryce 'was a mercenary, pure and simple, the only man capable of leading them to the elusive pot of gold, if it existed,’ and was accordingly appointed their Generalissimo.

The Magonista cause was now starting to attract newspaper headlines in the U.S., and journalists were braving the journey across the border for the chance of an interview with the enigmatic Welshman. In one interview, which appeared in the Sunset Magazine, shortly after the massacre at John Little's Ranch, Pryce was quoted as saying his men were, "a bully fine lot. I thought I'd lose half of them after the first fight, but it only seems to have wet their whistle. Still, they haven't looked on their own dead, and that makes a difference. I'll lose lots of them if I don't give them more action. The young bloodhounds! They must have it." All was not well, however, for Pryce's gentlemanly approach to command failed to prevent the emergence of dissenting parties, perhaps not altogether surprising given that his ranks included several well-known American criminals who had crossed the border to avoid the hangman's noose - in fact Pryce was compelled to order the execution of at least two of his men, one for rape the other for murder.

In May, with a force now totalling 200 mounted men, Pryce set out to capture the gambling town of Tijuana, a journey in which his men had to cross much difficult terrain, varying from sweltering deserts to freezing mountain tops. The town was garrisoned by 100 men, but Pryce's morning attack quickly secured the southern perimeter, at which point he invited the Garrison C.O. to surrender. The latter having declined his offer, Pryce's force swept forward to complete the occupation of the town, his men showing no quarter or mercy and 'fighting like demons, time and again rushing trenches or strongholds in the face of a veritable rain of lead', fighting that cost the Mexicans 18 killed and Pryce's force seven killed. The way was now open to advance on the capital Ensenada. However, the victory at Tijuana was overshadowed by the capture of Ciudad Juarez by the Maderista General Orozco, which development persuaded Pryce that he required more arms and ammunition before continuing his advance. Accordingly, in the company of "Melbourne" Hopkins, he crossed the border under an assumed identity in order to meet Magon's representative in San Diego, but on arrival found his pseudonym to be all but useless, events in Mexico having attracted the headlines - in fact Pryce and Hopkins were inundated with free drinks, the former having achieved local celebrity status as "The Mexican Robin Hood". Alerted to their presence, the U.S. authorities moved in and arrested them on 19 May, then rushed them through proceedings at the District Court the next day, but only for the War Department to sanction their release after no evidence was secured to hold them.

Returning to his troops at Tijuana, Pryce was dismayed to discover that Diaz had signed a treaty with Madero on 25 May, the former fleeing to France and the latter now close to gaining power as a result of imminent elections. His position untenable, Pryce crossed the border for L.A. for a final show down with Magon, who hitherto had been of little assistance; leaving behind a Tijuana that one observer described as 'like living on the brink of a volcano; with not a sane man in the entire town, just anarchy.' In Pryce's words:

It was getting so serious that I came up to Los Angeles to see the Junta and find out what they intended doing. They had no money, and we didn't have any ammunition and it was useless to move on to Ensenada. So when I found the jig was up, I wrote back to the boys at Tijuana and advised them to disband. Hopkins and I came north to look for something else. Perhaps some day we may go back. I could hold Lower California with a 1,000 men and a couple of screw guns.'

His men were ordered by Magon to continue flying the Red Flag, but in reality, without Pryce's military acumen, and sufficient ammunition, their future was bleak, and on 22 June, one week after Pryce's departure, Vega returned with a force which outnumbered the Magonistas six-to-one, and retook Tijuana and massacred the insurrectos to a man.

For his own part, Pryce was intercepted by F.B.I. agents just north of San Francisco, the Mexican Consul demanding that he be extradited to face charges of arson and murder, charges that he vehemently denied, and charges that he was cleared of by Commissioner Van Dyke in the District Court of Southern California on 28 September 1911 - the hearing had lasted a week, attracting a large amount of press coverage, and was filled with intrigue, one of the chief witnesses for the defence being murdered before he had the chance to give evidence that favoured Pryce. Be that as it may, Pryce was cleared of violation of neutrality laws and released, once more finding himself back on the streets.

== Hollywood ==
Pryce later became a Hollywood actor in the days of the silent screen, acting in a number of films. He played himself in The Colonel's Escape, based on the story of the Magonista Revolution and his role in it.

== First World War ==
Pryce returned to Canada and joined the Fort Garry Horse at Winnipeg in 1914, but subsequently transferred in the rank of Lieutenant to the 5th Brigade, Canadian Field Artillery, Humphries stating that 'after ten months training, he sailed with the Canadian Expeditionary Force to England aboard the S.S. Irishman, transferring again on arrival to the Royal Field Artillery, attached to the 38th (Welsh) Division, of which his elder brother, Harry, was a General Staff Officer.'

Pryce was appointed Commanding Officer of 'A' Battery, 119th Field Artillery Brigade, and entered the French theatre of war with his battery in November 1915. Ably assisted by Battery Sergeant-Major E. G. Horlock, V.C., who he described in his diary as a 'treasure', Pryce witnessed heavy fighting on the Somme in 1916, when ordered to get his guns into position behind Fricourt, not far from Mametz Wood, one of the objectives of the famous July offensive. The day before, when part of his diary was blown away by a piece of German shrapnel, he and two other officers were reconnoitring the German positions at Contalmaison when they came upon an enemy machine-gun position held by 17 Germans - all of whom surrendered to the British officers after a furious exchange of fire. By late May 1917, his battery was in position awaiting the assault on Messines, 'but shortly before this began Pryce was hit in the shoulder by a shrapnel burst on 3 June. Sufficiently badly wounded to be invalided home, he spent the remainder of the war in command of a Reserve Artillery Brigade at Aldershot. Twice mentioned in despatches (London Gazette 4 January 1917 and 23 August 1917 refer), he was gazetted for his D.S.O. on the day he was wounded, an award believed to have stemmed from his earlier capture of the enemy machine-gun post on the Somme.

== Personal life ==
He married Ellen Mary Morkill, widow of Lt R.F Morkill, RFC, daughter of Thomas Loiseleur Wilkinson and Mary Valentina Alexander, of Neasham Abbey, Durham, in October 1918, in Eastbourne, Sussex.

He died on 26 November 1955 at the Cottage Hospital, Cockermouth, Cumberland, England.

== Bibliography ==
- Blaisdell, Lowell L. (1954). "Was It Revolution or Filibustering? The Mystery of the Flores Magón Revolt in Baja California". Pacific Historical Review. 23 (2): 147–164. doi:10.2307/3634290. ISSN 0030-8684. JSTOR 3634290.
- Blaisdell, Lowell L. (1957). "Rhys Pryce, the Reluctant Filibuster". The Southwestern Social Science Quarterly. 38 (2): 148–161. ISSN 0276-1742. JSTOR 42866093.
- Humphries, John (2005). Gringo Revolutionary: The Amazing Adventures of Caryl ap Rhys Pryce. Glyndwr Publishing. ISBN 9781903529188.
- Marentes, Luis A. (2019). "The Flores Magón Brothers and Magonismo on the Borderlands". Oxford Research Encyclopedia of Literature. Oxford University Press. doi:10.1093/acrefore/9780190201098.013.640. ISBN 9780190201098.
- Taylor, Lawrence D. (1996). "Gunboat Diplomacy's Last Fling in the New World: The British Seizure of San Quintin, April 1911". The Americas. 52 (4): 521–543. doi:10.2307/1008476. ISSN 0003-1615. JSTOR 1008476. S2CID 151359723.
- Taylor, Lawrence D. (1999). "The Magonista Revolt in Baja California". The Journal of San Diego History. 45 (1).
- Taylor, Lawrence D. (2002). "Wobbly Volunteers in the 1911 Magonista Revolt in Baja California". Social Anarchism (32). ProQuest 232460061.
- Taylor, Lawrence D. (2007). "Fighting for the patria on the 'wrong' side of the border: The role of the Mexican consuls in the federal campaign against the magonista rebels in Baja California in 1911". Journal of Borderlands Studies. 22 (2): 1–20. doi:10.1080/08865655.2007.9695674. ISSN 2159-1229. S2CID 144995091.
