= Porfiriato =

Period of authoritarian rule in Mexico (1876–1911)

- 1876 – 1911; Treaty of Ciudad Juárez
Restored Republic	Revolutionary Mexico
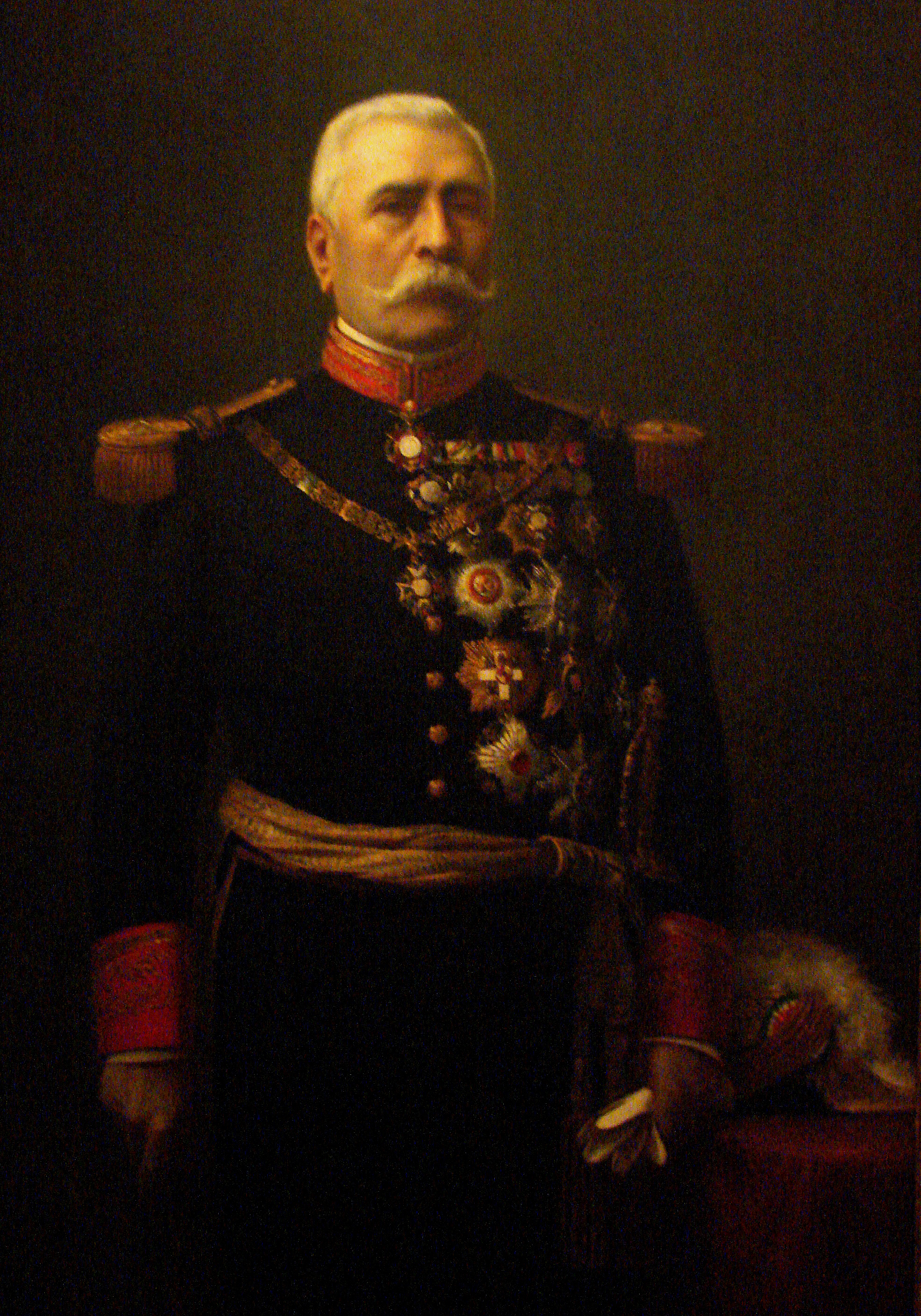
- President Gen. Porfirio Díaz
- Location: Mexico
- President(s): Porfirio Díaz (1876; 1877–1880; 1884–1911); Juan N. Méndez (1876–1877); Manuel González Flores (1880–1884)
- Key events: Mexican Revolution

The Porfiriato or Porfirismo (/ˌpɔːrfɪəriˈætoʊ/, Spanish: [poɾfiˈɾjato]), coined by Mexican historian Daniel Cosío Villegas, is a term given to the period when General Porfirio Díaz ruled Mexico first as a president within a constitutional framework, and later, after 1884 (especially following the purging of the Congress into a rubber stamp in 1886 after the dissent on the English debt crisis), under an authoritarian military dictatorship in the late 19th and early 20th centuries. Seizing power in a coup in 1876, Díaz pursued a policy of "order and progress", inviting foreign investment in Mexico and maintaining social and political order, by force if necessary. There were significant economic, technological, social, and cultural changes during this period.

As Díaz approached his 80th birthday in 1910, having been continuously elected since 1884, he still had not put in place a plan for his succession. The fraudulent 1910 elections are usually seen as the end of the Porfiriato. Violence broke out, Díaz was forced to resign and go into exile, and Mexico experienced a decade of regional civil war, the Mexican Revolution.

== Porfiriato as a historical period ==
Historians have investigated the era of Díaz's presidency as a cohesive historical period based on political transitions. In particular, this means separating the period of "order and progress" after 1884 from the tumultuous decade of the Mexican Revolution (1910–1920) and post-Revolution developments, but increasingly the Porfiriato is seen as laying the basis for post-revolutionary Mexico. Under Díaz, Mexico was able to centralize authority, manage political infighting, tamp down banditry, and shift tendencies of economic nationalism to embrace foreign investment. That major economic shift allowed rapid economic and technological change, an openness to cultural innovation, increasing urbanization, and shifts in societal attitudes of elites. The benefits of economic growth were unevenly distributed and social ills increased, including debt peonage of the peasantry and child labor in new industrial enterprises. The defeat of Mexican conservatives in the War of the Reform and the French intervention in Mexico cleared a path for liberals to implement their vision of Mexico.

Díaz, after whom the period is named, was a liberal Mexican army general who had distinguished himself during the War of Reform and the French intervention. He had aspirations to be president of Mexico, which came to fruition when he rebelled against Sebastián Lerdo de Tejada under the Plan of Tuxtepec. He initially ruled from 1876 until 1880. Díaz's first term is sometimes treated separately, as he consolidated power and sought the U.S. government's recognition of his regime. The Plan of Tuxtepec explicitly called for no reelection of the president, so at the end of Díaz's term, a political ally from the Federal Army, General Manuel González, became president for one term. In 1884, Díaz abandoned the principle of no reelection and returned to the presidency, not relinquishing it until 1911. Francisco I. Madero challenged Díaz in 1910, campaigning under the slogan "Effective suffrage, no reelection".

== Political order ==
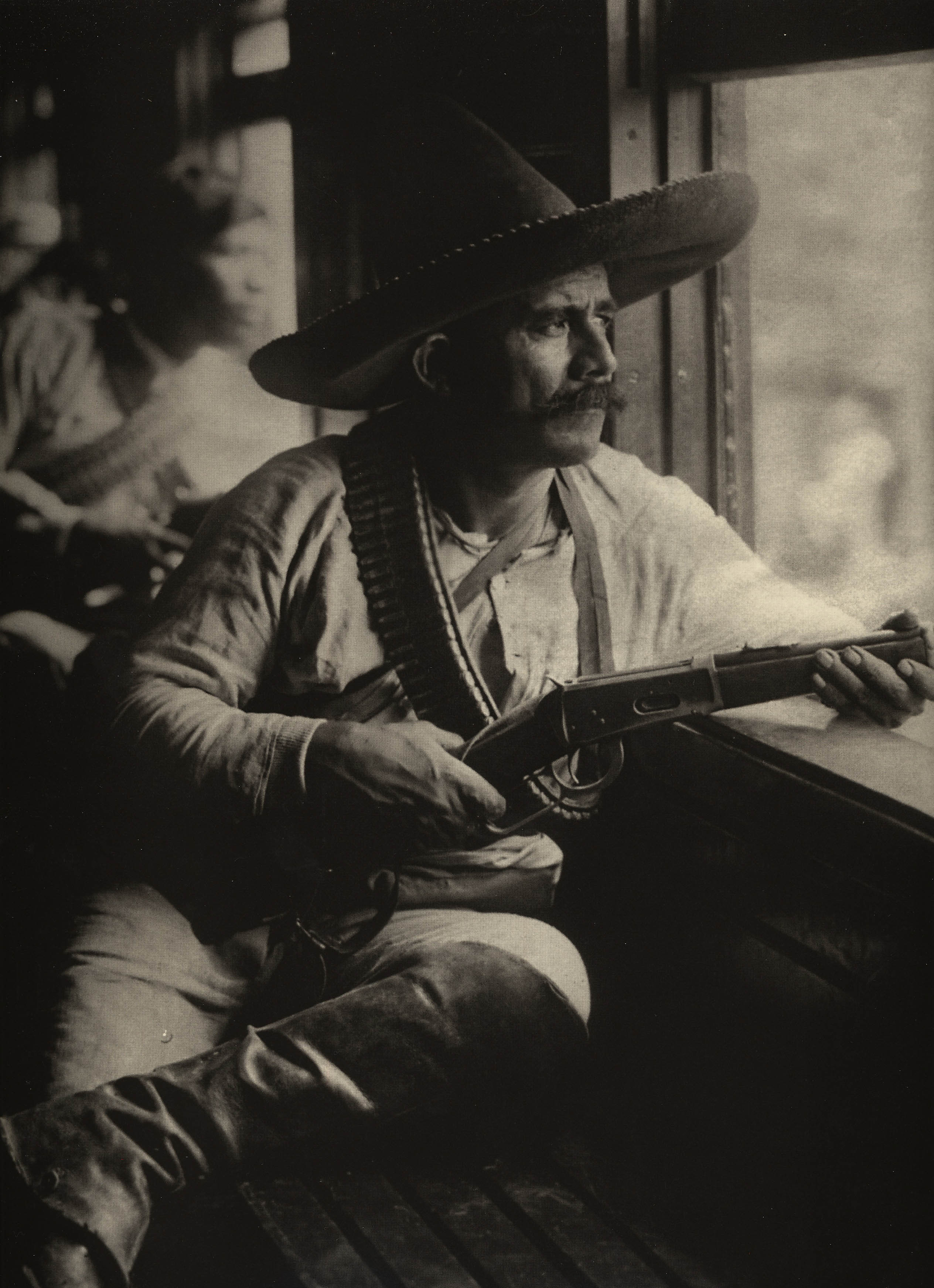
Rural on board a train. Photograph Manuel Ramos, published in La Revista de Revistas, May 1912

Starting with Díaz's second term (1884–1888), following the interregnum of President González, the regime has been characterized as a dictatorship, with no opponents of Díaz elected to Congress and Díaz staying in office with undemocratic elections. Congress was Díaz's rubber stamp for legislation since the rigged 1886 midterms caused by earlier parliamentary dissent against Díaz during the 1884–1885 English debt crisis when rival parliamentary deputies backed the protesting student groups, turning a country from a competitive anocracy with many democratic remnants from the Juárez era into a personal autocracy, which manifested into later parliament's submission to an amendment to the constitution allowing for re-election in 1887 and 1890. Internal stability, sometimes called the Pax Porfiriana, was coupled with the increasing strength of the Mexican state, fueled by increased revenues from an expanding economy. Díaz replaced a number of independent regional leaders with men loyal to himself, and quelled discontent by coopting political "outs" by making them intermediaries with foreign investors, allowing their personal enrichment. To further consolidate state power, Díaz appointed jefes políticos ("political bosses") answerable to central government, who commanded local forces. The policies of conciliation, cooptation and repression allowed the regime to maintain order for decades.

In central Mexico, indigenous communities that had exercised political and economic control over their lands and populations were undermined by the Díaz regime through expropriation of lands and weakening or absence of indigenous leadership. Expropriation of village lands occurred as landed estates (haciendas), often owned by foreign investors, expanded. Díaz used coercion to repress democratic power, using pan o palo or "bread or bludgeon" policy. This allowed him to appoint state governors who could do what they wanted to local populations, so long as they did not interfere with Díaz's operations. This process is known for the state of Morelos before the Mexican Revolution when Emiliano Zapata emerged as a leader in Anenecuilco to defend village lands and rights. Since the Díaz regime aimed to reconcile foreign investors and large estate owners, foreign and domestic, indigenous villages suffered politically and economically.

When Díaz came to power in 1876, the northern border of Mexico with the U.S. became a region of tension and conflict, which had to be resolved in order for Díaz's regime to be recognized as the sovereign government of Mexico. Indigenous groups and cattle thieves marauded in the border region. The Apache did not recognize the sovereignty of either the U.S. or Mexico over their territories, but used the international division to their advantage, raiding on one side of the border and seeking sanctuary on the other. Thieves stole cattle and likewise used the border to escape authorities. The U.S. used the border issue as a reason to withhold recognition of Díaz's regime and a low-level international conflict continued. The issue of recognition was finally resolved when Díaz's government granted generous concessions to prominent U.S. promoters of investment in Mexico, who pressured President Rutherford B. Hayes to grant recognition in 1878. It was clear to Díaz that order was to be maintained over all other considerations.

The turmoil of over a decade of war (1857–1867) and economic disruption gave rise to banditry. To combat this, during the administration of civilian president Benito Juárez, a small, efficient rural police force under his control, known as the Rurales, was a tool to impose order. When Díaz became president, he expanded the size and scope of the Rurales; they were under his command and control in a way the Mexican army was not. The slogan of the Porfiriato, "order and progress," affirmed that without political order, economic development and growth—progress—was impossible. Investors would be unwilling to risk their capital if political conditions were unstable.

The construction of railways gave the government more effective control of many regions of Mexico that had maintained a level of independence due to their distance from the capital. The construction of telegraph lines alongside railroad tracks further facilitated the government's control, so that orders from Mexico City were instantly transmitted to officials elsewhere. The government could respond quickly to regional revolts by loading armed Rurales and their horses on trains to quell disturbances. By the end of the 19th century, violence had almost completely disappeared.

== Philosophy ==
Díaz himself was a pragmatic politician, but Mexican intellectuals sought to articulate a rationale for their form of liberalism. The advocates were called Científicos, "men of science." They found a basis for such a philosophy by grafting to Mexico French philosopher Auguste Comte's Positivism and Herbert Spencer's social Darwinism. Positivism sought to ground knowledge on observation and empirically based knowledge rather than metaphysics or religious belief. In Mexico, liberal intellectuals believed that Mexico's stability under Díaz was due to his strong government. In Social Darwinism and Positivism intellectuals saw the justification of their rule due to their superiority over a largely rural, largely indigenous and mixed-race (mestizo) Mexican population. Liberals sought to develop Mexico economically and sought to implement progress by an ideology promoting attitudes that were "nationalist, pro-capitalist, and moral tenets of thrift, hard work, entrepreneurialism, proper hygiene, and temperance."

== Economy ==
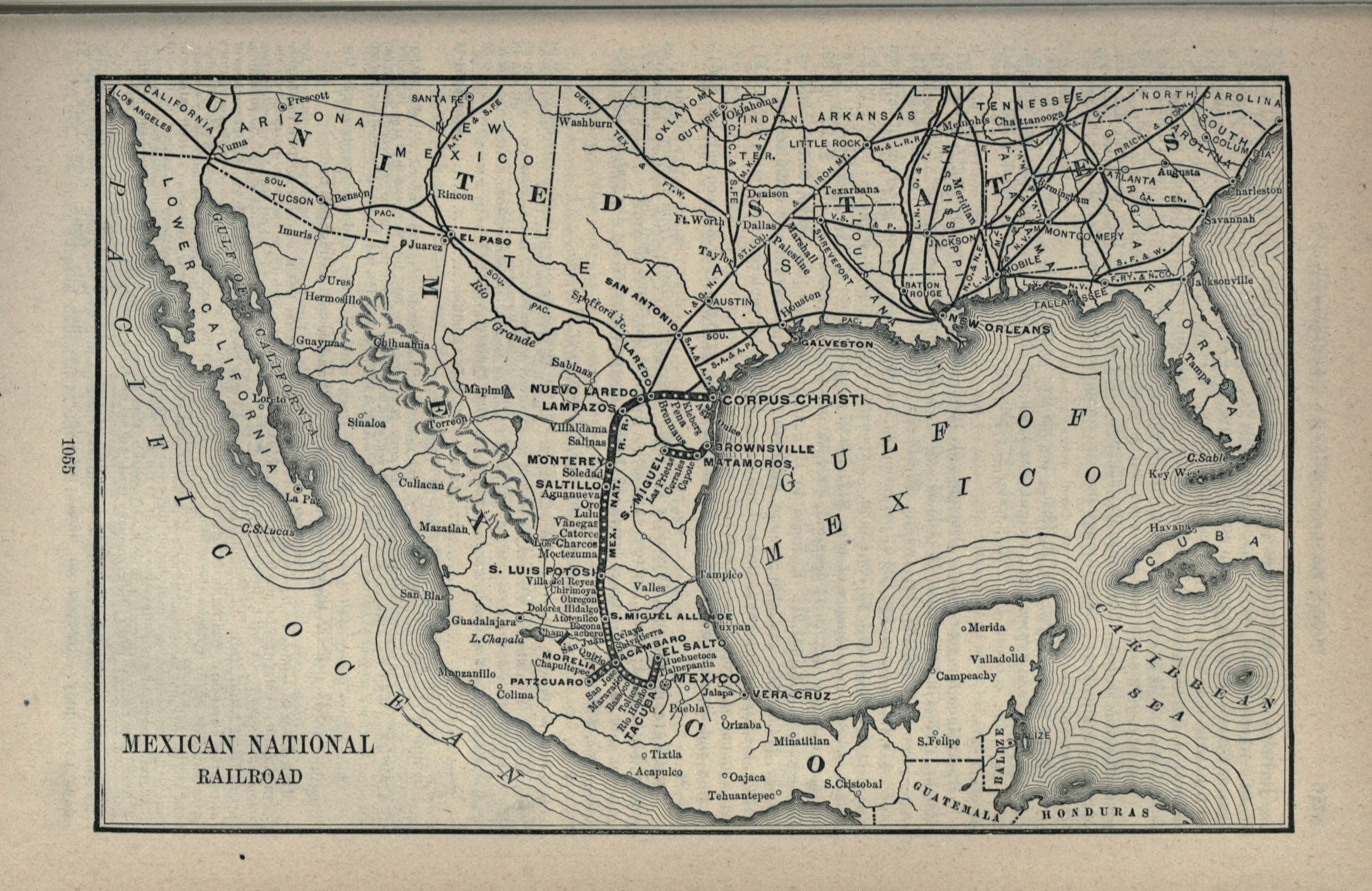
Mexican National Railroad 1891

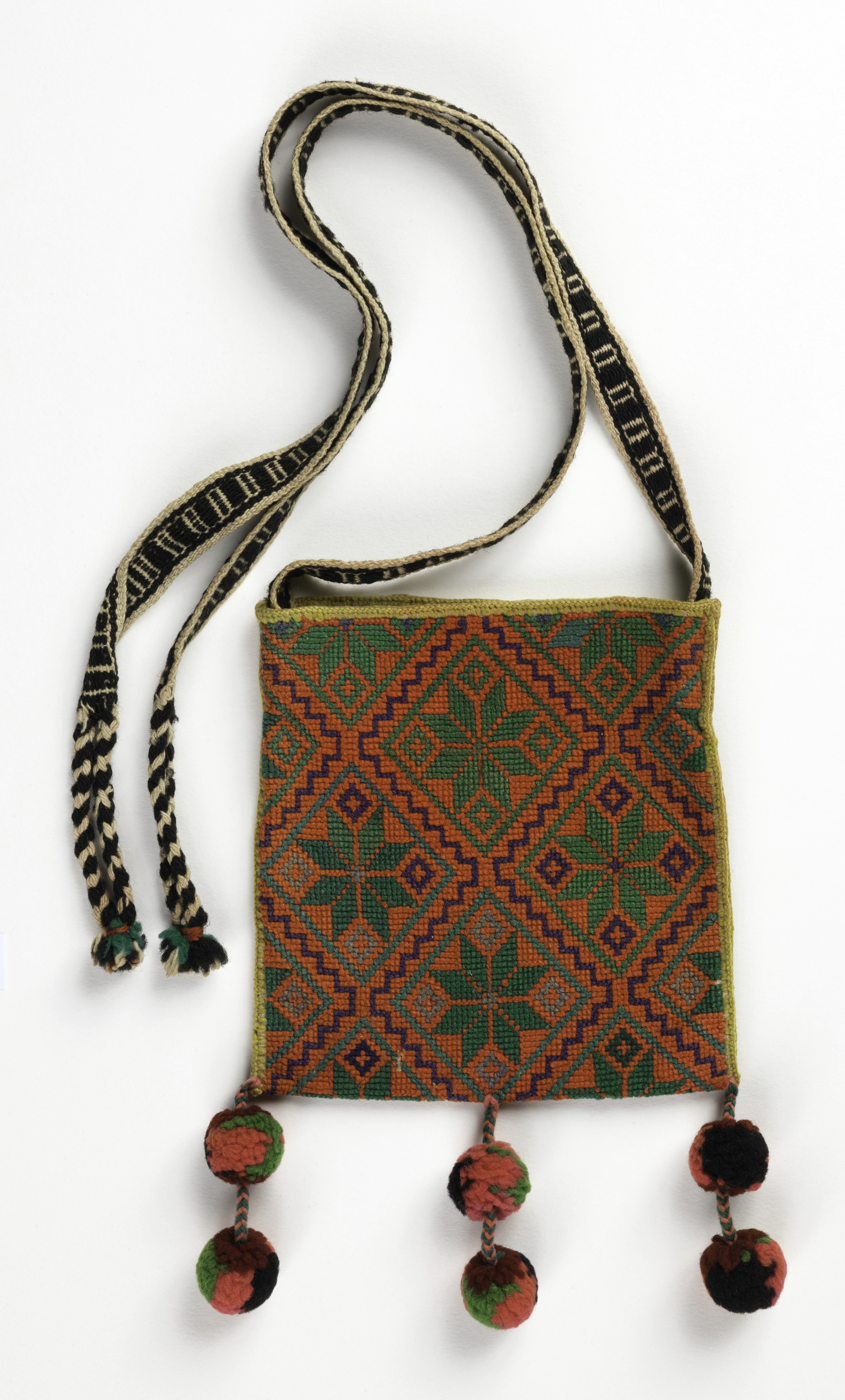
Henequen bag from the 19th century, one of main contemporary industrialized products produced by Mexico. Cooper Hewitt, Smithsonian Design Museum.

Mexico at the beginning of the Porfiriato was a predominantly rural nation, with large estate owners controlling agricultural production for the local and regional food market. The largest groups of Mexicans involved in agriculture were small-scale ranchers and subsistence agriculturalists along with landless peasants tilling lands they did not own. Patterns of land ownership were shifting in the nineteenth century. The Liberal Reform had sought to eliminate corporate ownership of land, targeting estates owned by the Roman Catholic Church and indigenous communities, forcing them to be broken up into parcels and sold. Despite liberals’ hopes, this did not result in the creation of a class of yeoman farmers, but it did undermine the integrity of indigenous communities and undermine the economic power of the Church. These landholdings were deemed "vacant," even if others were living on them. Their ownership would be invalidated in the government courts to make room for Díaz's allies. Rurales would be utilized to dispose of peasants, and the peasant effort to reclaim native land would be severely weakened given that they were often illiterate and could not hire lawyers.

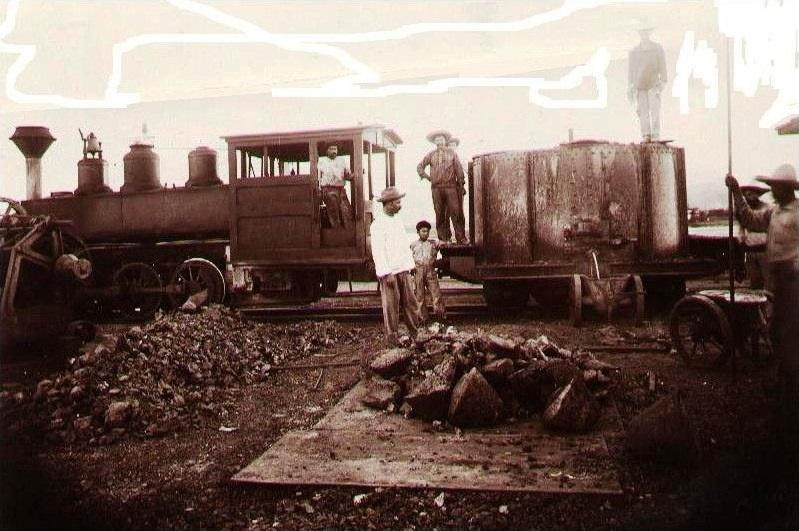
Mine of El Boleo Waterfront built

Construction of railway lines was a major factor in transforming the Mexican economy. Mexico is not endowed with a navigable river system that would have allowed for cheap water transport, and roads were often impassable during the rainy season, so the construction of railway lines overcame a major obstacle for Mexican economic development. The first line to be built was from the Gulf port of Veracruz to Mexico City, begun during the French intervention, but the rapid expansion of lines in central Mexico and northward to the U.S. border lowered transportation costs for passengers and freight, opened new regions, such as the Comarca Lagunera in northern Mexico, to agricultural development. The capital for railways as well as tracks and rolling stock were foreign. Investment in such capital demanding infrastructure is an indicator that foreign investors had confidence in Mexico's stability. Construction of the railways was an effect of stability, but there was a significant decrease in banditry and other unrest because of the railways. The Rurales and their horses could be loaded on trains and dispatched to impose order.

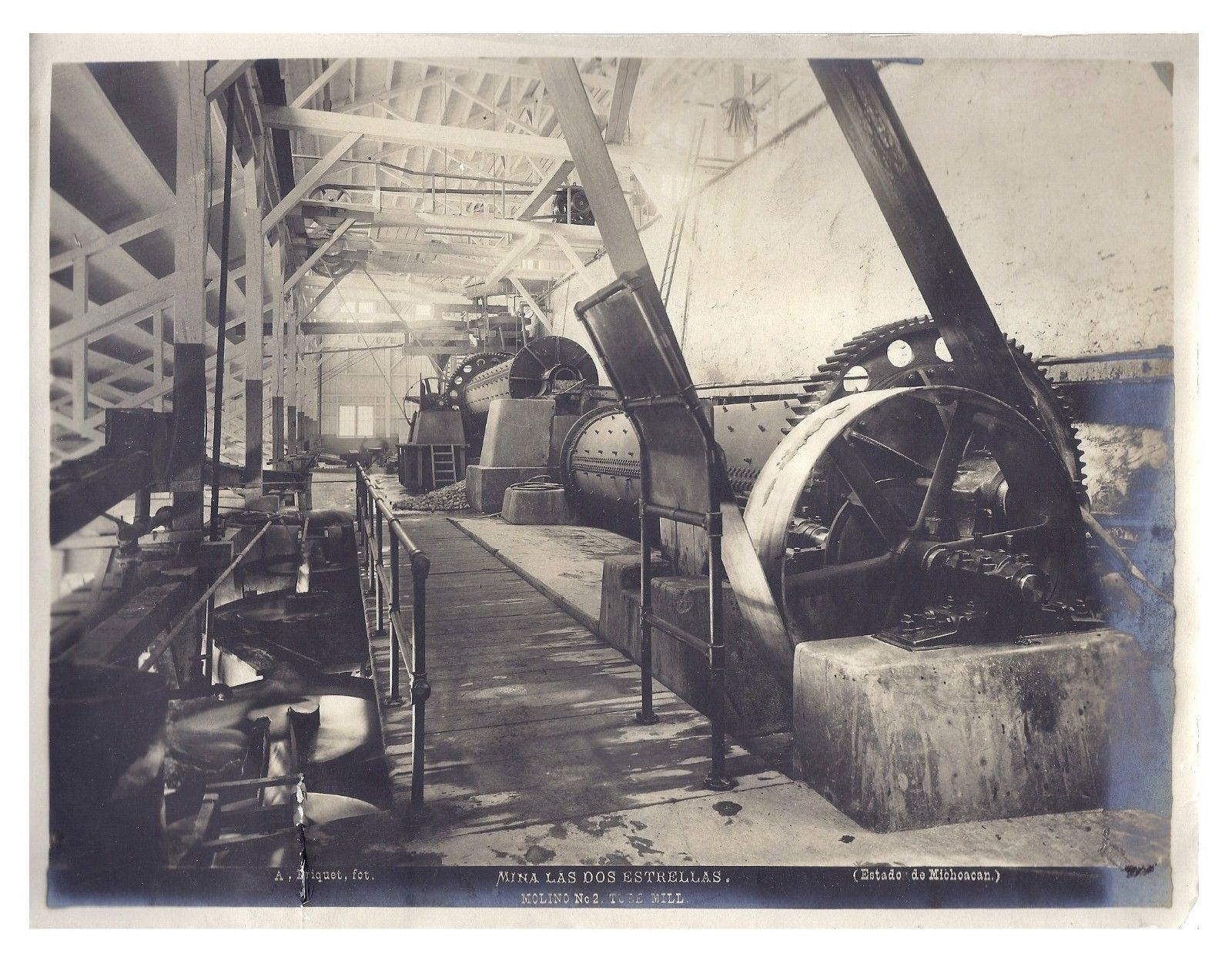
Dos Estrellas mine, ca. 1905. Photo Abel Briquet

Along with the construction of railways, telegraph lines were built next to the tracks. This allowed instant communication between capital and distant cities, increasing the power of the central Mexican state over distant regions. Dispatching Rurales quickly to troubled areas was a direct effect of more efficient communication. An industry that expanded significantly during this time was mining. In the colonial era, Mexico had mined and refined silver, minting silver coinage that became the first global currency. This silver industry had declined after independence, as the prevalent refining processes in the early 19th century (the patio process and later the pan amalgamation process) required mercury; during the colonial era, this was imported from Spain, which had been one of the world's leading producers of mercury since Roman times. However, the Spanish refused to sell the reagent to its former colonies and it was not available locally in industrial quantities. Silver mining later revived with new processes not requiring mercury, but during the Porfiriato, mining of industrial minerals became the core of the industry.

The world price of silver dropped in 1873, while at the same time economies in developed countries needed industrial minerals for their manufacturing. As with other aspects of the Mexican economy, the growth in the mining sector was predicated on the stability established by the government. The expansion of the railway network meant that ore could be transported cheaply and the telegraph network allowed investors to have efficient communications with the mining sites. Foreign investors, particularly from the U.S., had confidence in risking their capital in mining enterprises in Mexico. Mining enterprises for copper, lead, iron, and coal in Mexico's north, especially Sonora, Chihuahua, Durango, Guanajuato and Coahuila, with Monterrey and Aguascalientes becoming especially prominent.

The development of industrial manufacturing aimed at a domestic market, primarily in textiles. Factories were built in urban areas by Mexican entrepreneurs in Orizaba and Guanajuato, which provided opportunities for workers to earn wages. These factories, many owned by French nationals, supplied domestic textile needs. Furthermore, these factories were steam-powered, capitalizing on modern invention.

== Labor ==
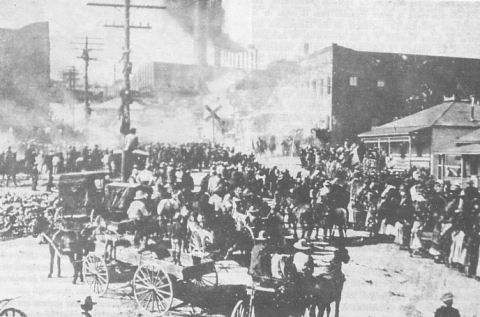
Rioters burning company store during Cananea strike

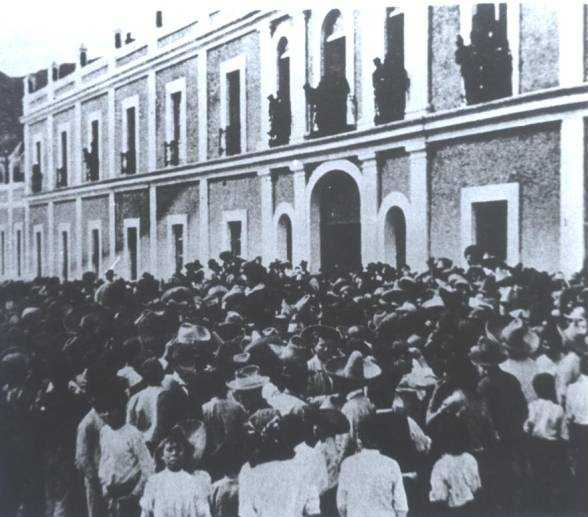
Rioters in front of the factory during Río Blanco strike

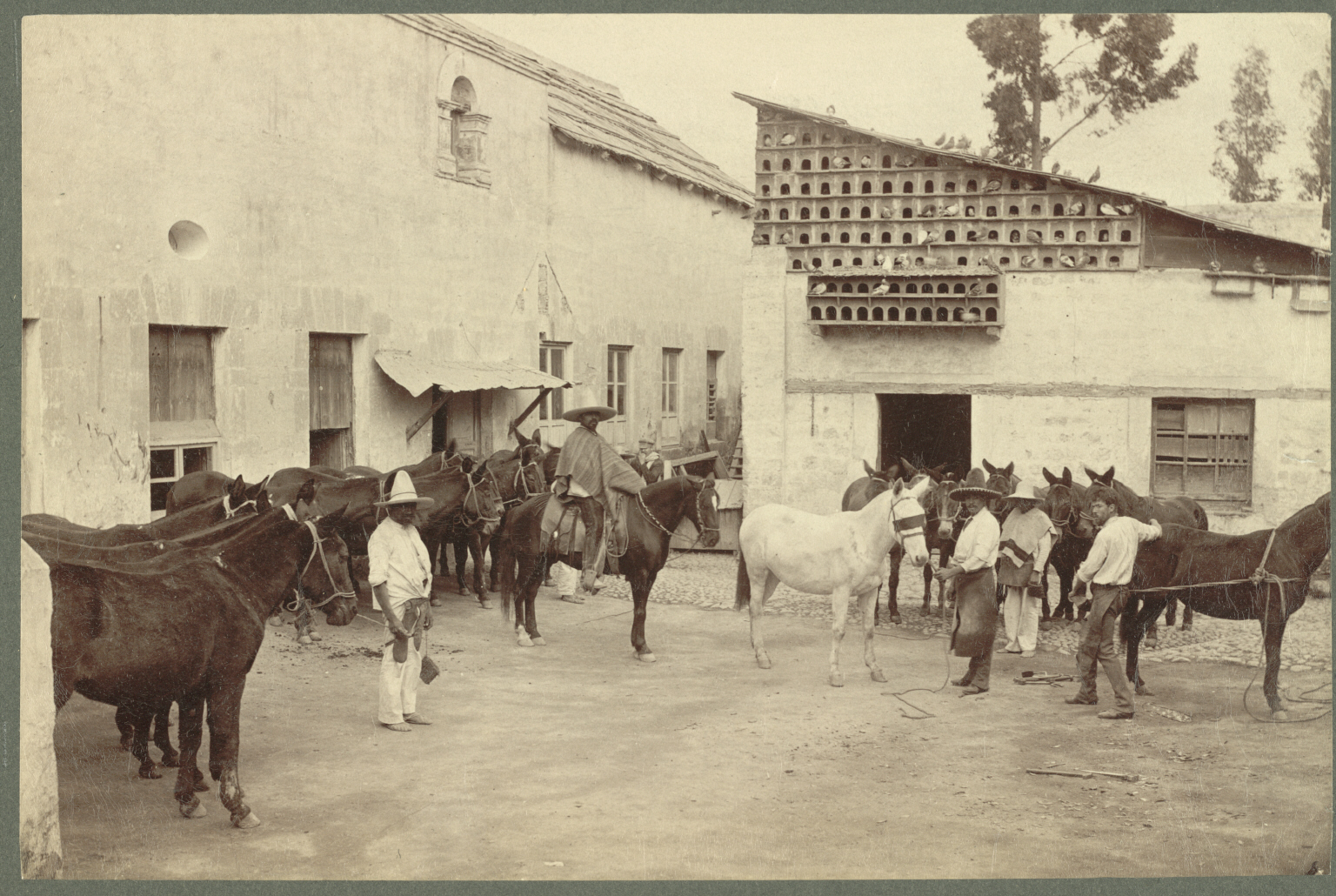
Shoeing Mules (Mexican Village Scene). Photo by Abel Briquet. Although mechanization was taking hold during the Porfiriato, much labor was still performed by humans and animals in isolated areas.

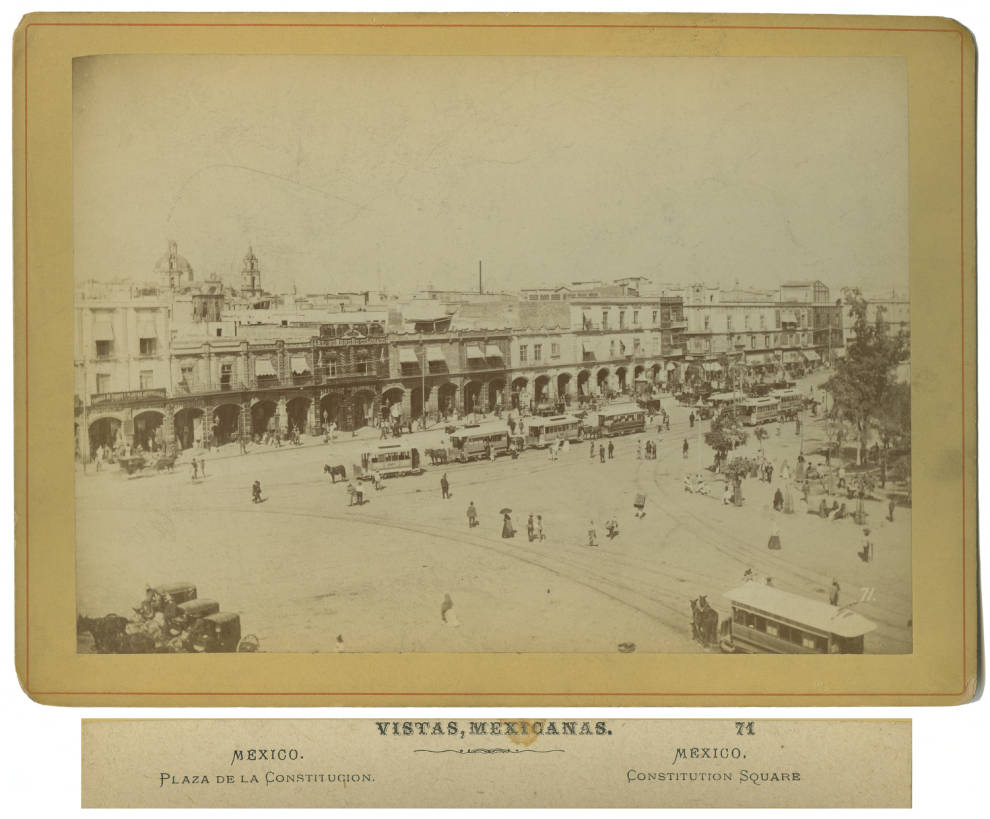
Mexico City Zócalo, with mule-drawn streetcars, ca. 1890. Photo by Abel Briquet

Craft artisan organizations already existed when Díaz came to power in 1876, as mutualist organizations or worker benevolent societies, and conducted strikes. The Gran Círculo de Obreros de México had nearly 30 branches in Mexico, calling for benefits beyond aiding of workers when they were sick, injured, or died. In 1875, the Congreso Obrero sought broader goals, including education for adult workers, compulsory education for children, and representation of their goals to authorities. The labor movement was not unified, including on whether to take political positions. During the late 1870s and early 1880s, journeyman artisans could no longer successfully aspire to being master artisans owning their own shop. Their discontent led to agitation, but the formation of combative industrial labor organizations in the later nineteenth century can be seen as roots of the modern labor movement in Mexico.

After 1900, as Mexico's economy was expanding dramatically with the infusion of foreign capital and the growth of various industries, organized industrial labor grew as well. Workers resisted mechanization of such industries as textiles, where owners sought higher productivity per worker. Strikes in cotton textile mills took place, with the Río Blanco strike being the best known. Railway workers were the best unionized in the late Porfiriatio, with some 50% of them being unionized. There was not a single union, but rather split along particular tasks, such as engineers and firemen. More highly skilled jobs were dominated by U.S. workers, and Mexican laborers were paid less for the same work. Mine workers also organized, with the Cananea Strike in 1906 the most widely known, since the mine was owned by U.S. interests and armed men from Arizona crossed into Mexico to suppress the strike. Although the Liberal Party of Mexico (PLM) advocated radical changes in favor of labor, most industrial workers were reformist not revolutionary. As the Díaz regime failed to respond to calls for reform, many workers saw regime change as desirable.

With the expansion of the railway network, workers could seek work far away from their homes. In Mexico City, the development of a streetcar system, initially mule-drawn cars, and later electric ones, allowed for mass transportation. Street car companies employed a variety of workers to build the tracks, maintain the cars and mules, and serve as conductors. Urban women were able to obtain office employment in both government and private enterprises. Although women's presence in the home rather than working outside the home was a marker of middle class status, in the late nineteenth century respectable women were increasingly employed outside the home as office workers. During the Liberal Reform in the mid-nineteenth century, women began entering the workforce as public school teachers and in charitable work. The Díaz regime opened opportunities for women as government office workers in the 1890s. The creation of a Mexican government bureaucracy largely staffed by women at the lower levels occurred in similar fashion to other nations as educated women dealt with the expansion of official paperwork and the introduction of new office technology of the typewriter, telephone, and telegraph. Women also engaged in certain types of manual labor, including factory work in paper mills, cotton textiles, chocolate, shoes, and hats.

== Social class, gender roles, and citizenry ==
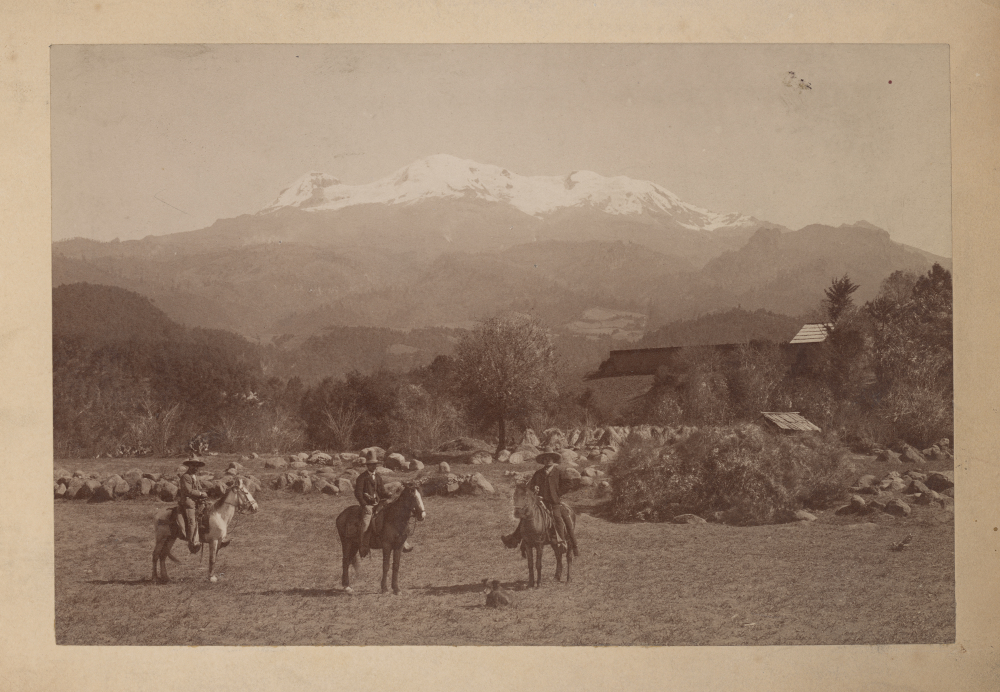
Entrepreneurs on horseback in their latifundio in front of Iztaccihuatl volcano c. between 1875 and 1899

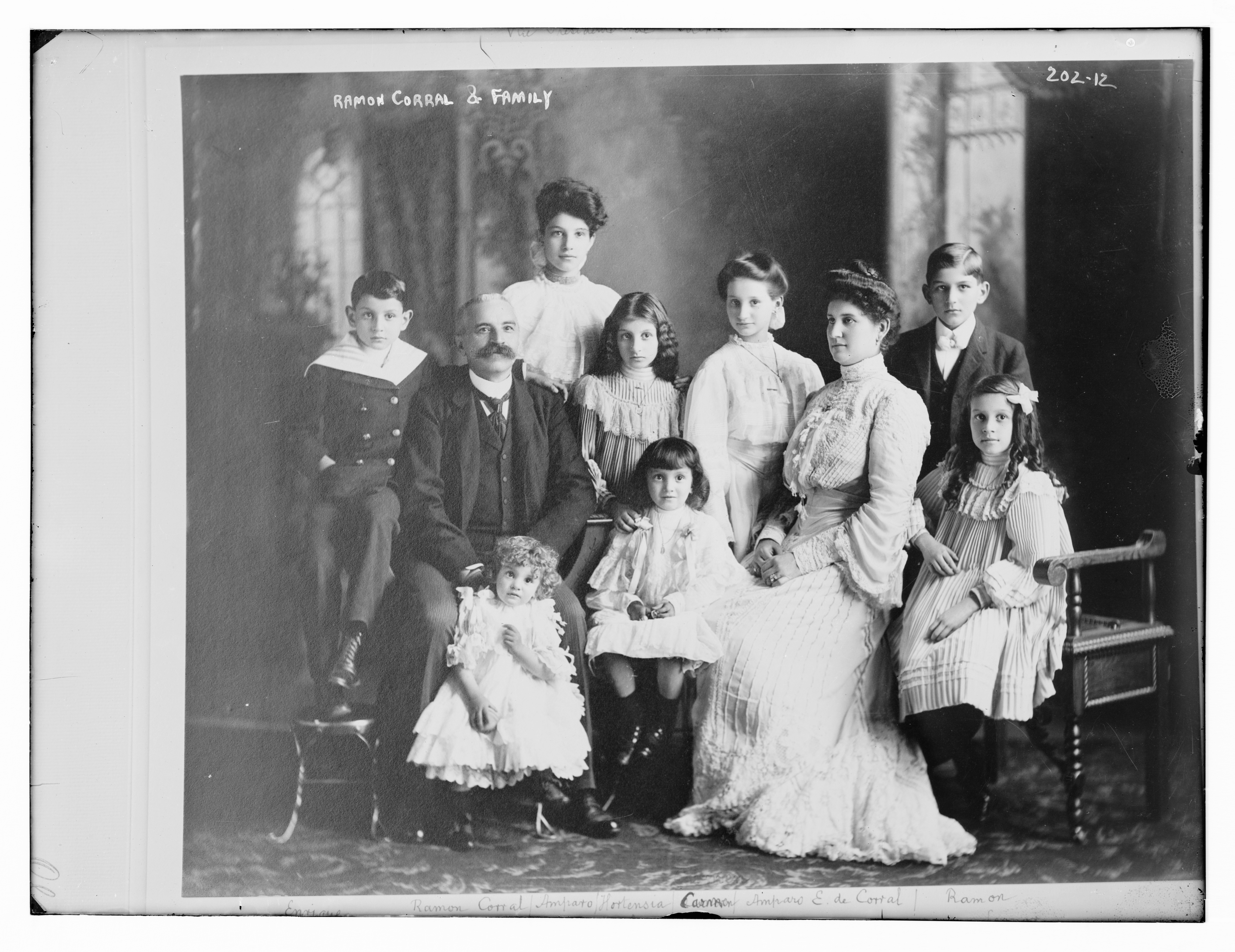
Diaz's Vice President, Ramón Corral and family dressed in European-style fashions

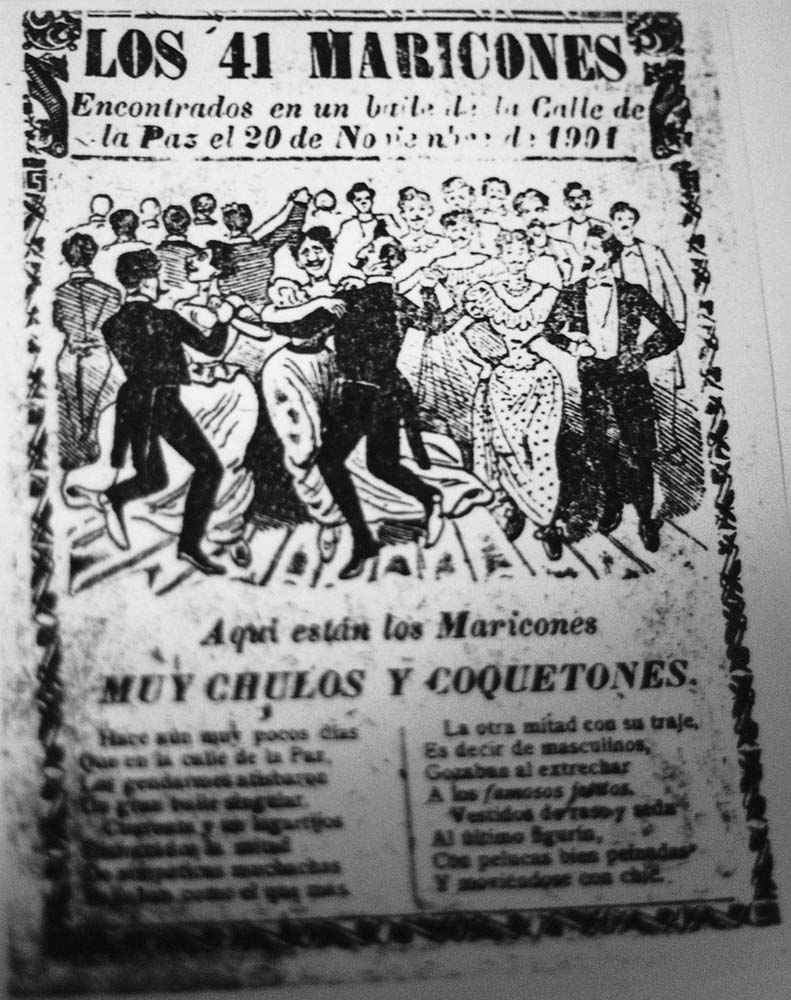
"Dance of the 41" José Guadalupe Posada 1901

During the Porfiriato a new type of public social life emerged. The Porfiriato was a period of unprecedented change in arts, vitality, and material wellbeing. Local economies were connected when the railroads were constructed. The increase of wealth due to increases in the export agriculture and industrialization largely benefited urban elites and foreigners, with the income and cultural gap with the poor widening. By far the largest sector of the Mexican population was rural with Mexico's cities, especially Mexico City, having the largest concentration of wealthy elites. Peasants tilled land that was generally owned by others. In the cities, plebeian women were domestic servants, workers in bakeries, and factories, while plebeian men pursued a whole variety of manual tasks. In central and southern Mexico, the state increasingly undermined the political structure of rule and the loss of community land had a significant impact. The liberal project sought to nurture a citizenry that adhered to civic virtues through improved public health, professional military training for men, a rehabilitative penal system, and secular public education. The state sought to replace traditional values based on religion and local loyalties with abstract principles shared by all citizens.

The Porfiriato saw the growth of the urban middle class, with women entering the work force as teachers and office workers. Women's new roles not only added to household income but also contributed to major cultural changes as they shaped the identity of a middle-class household and as some became visible as activists for women's rights. Middle class Mexican women began addressing gender inequality before the law, as well as other issues. Feminism in Mexico emerged during the Liberal Reform and Porfiriato, with adherents critiquing inequality in Mexican society, as happened elsewhere in the hemisphere and Western Europe. A few women formed all-women's groups to discuss issues of inequality, they founded literary journals, and attended international congresses on women's rights. Although there was some political pressure for women's suffrage in Mexico, it did not come to fruition until 1953.

Despite a societal shift in attitudes toward women's roles, sexual diversity did not change as rapidly. Homosexuality remained clandestine and private in general. In November 1901, there was a public scandal about a police raid of a gathering of gay and cross-dressing men in Mexico City, known as the Dance of the Forty-One. Caricaturist José Guadalupe Posada made a broadside of the incident. Rumors abounded that the son-in-law of Porfirio Díaz was one of those arrested, but released. A list of the arrested was never published and the government neither confirmed nor denied.

== Education ==
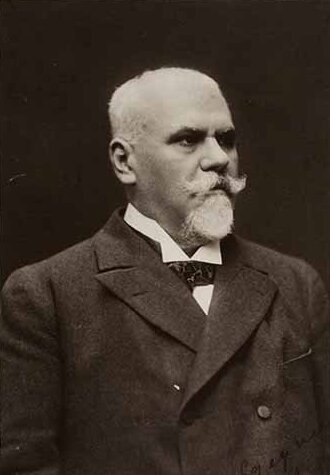
Justo Sierra, Díaz's Secretary of Education (1905–1911), who established the National University in Mexico

Liberals created a secular educational system to counter the religious influence of the Roman Catholic Church. Public schools had been established during the period of Benito Juárez, but expanded during the Porfiriato after the defeat of the French monarchy and their Mexican Catholic allies. Schools did not just teach literacy and numeracy, but also aimed at creating a workforce guided by principles of punctuality, thrift, valuable work habits, and abstinence from alcohol and tobacco use, and gambling. Even so, illiteracy was widespread, with the 1910 census indicating only 33% of men and 27% of women were literate. However, the government's commitment to education under Justo Sierra was an important step, particularly in higher education with the establishment of the secular, state-controlled Universidad Nacional de México. The Pontifical University of Mexico, founded in the early sixteenth century under religious authority, was suppressed in 1865. Teaching school was one of the few honorable professions open to women. Urban, educated women school teachers were in the forefront of feminists in Mexico.

== Public health ==
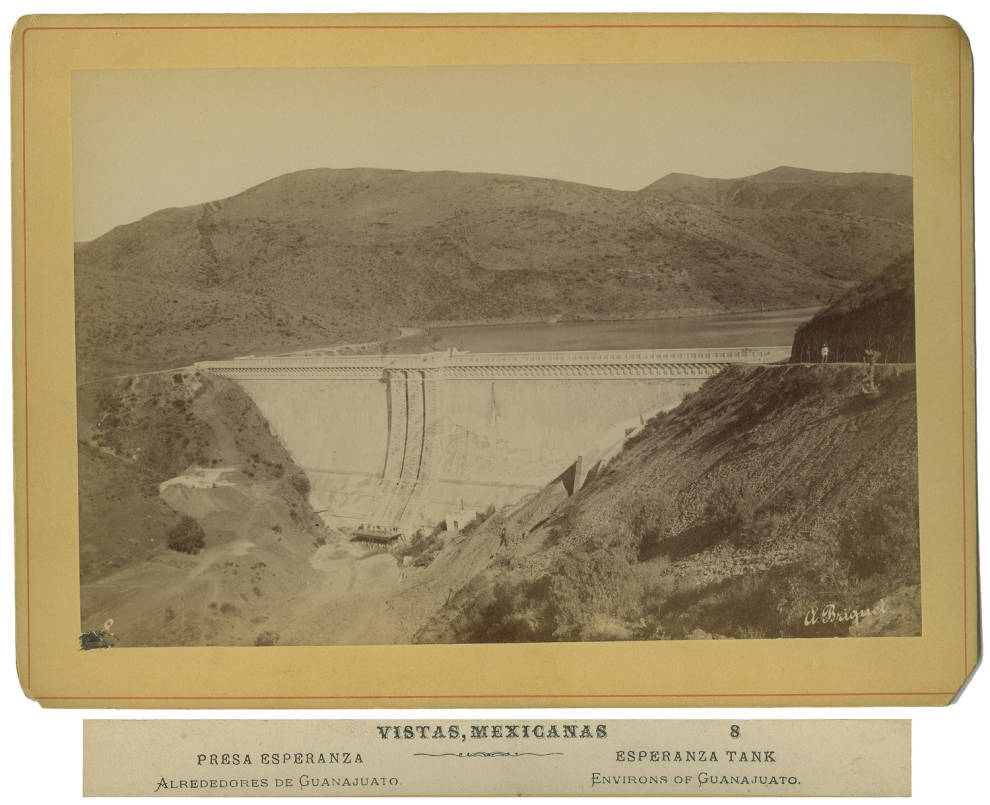
Esperanza Dam, Guanajuato was built in 1894 by Ponciano Aguilar. Photo Abel Briquet

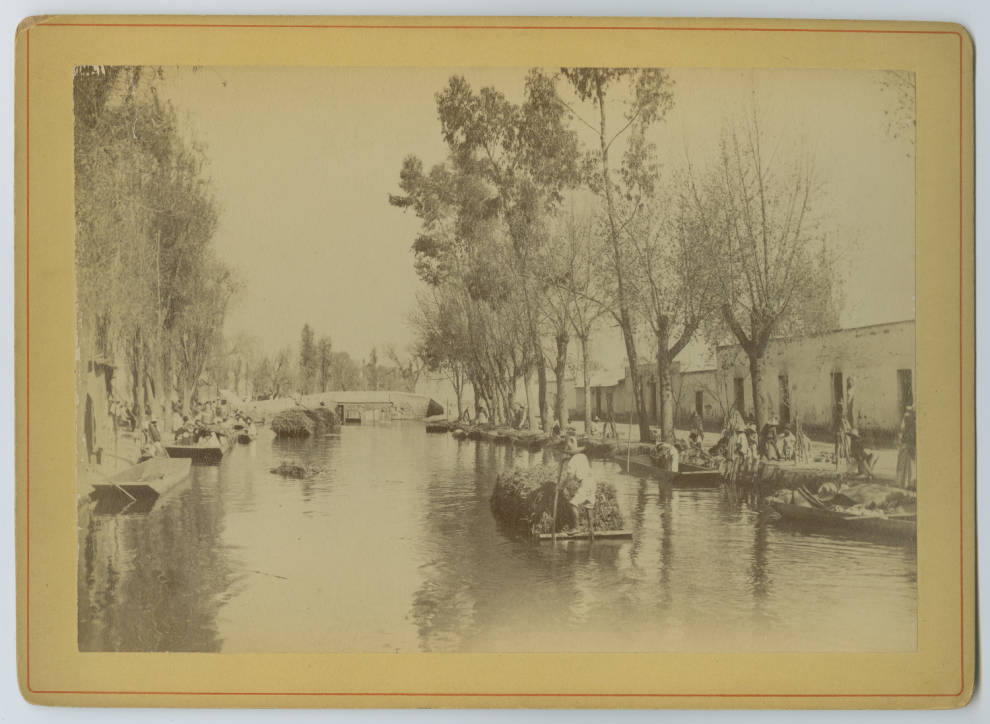
Canal de la Viga, Mexico City – photo by Abel Briquet

Public health became an important issue for the Mexican government, which viewed a healthy population as important for economic development. Government investment in public health was seen as part of Mexico's overall project of modernization. In Mexico City, the government invested in a large-scale infrastructure project to drain the central lake system, the desagüe, in an attempt to prevent frequent flooding in the capital. Canals in Mexico City still had considerable boat traffic, such as on the Canal de la Viga, but canals were where sewage, trash, and animal carcasses were dumped. Access to potable water often meant drawing it from community fountains and distributed house to house by workmen with wheelbarrows or carrying containers on their backs. Some households were too poor to pay for the service, so a household member would draw and transport the water. Planners viewed inadequate drainage, sewage treatment, and lack of access to clean, potable water as solvable problems using scientific methods. Another issue that modernizers tackled was sanitation in the meatpacking industry. Instilling ideas of proper hygiene were values to be imparted in schools.

== Penal reform ==
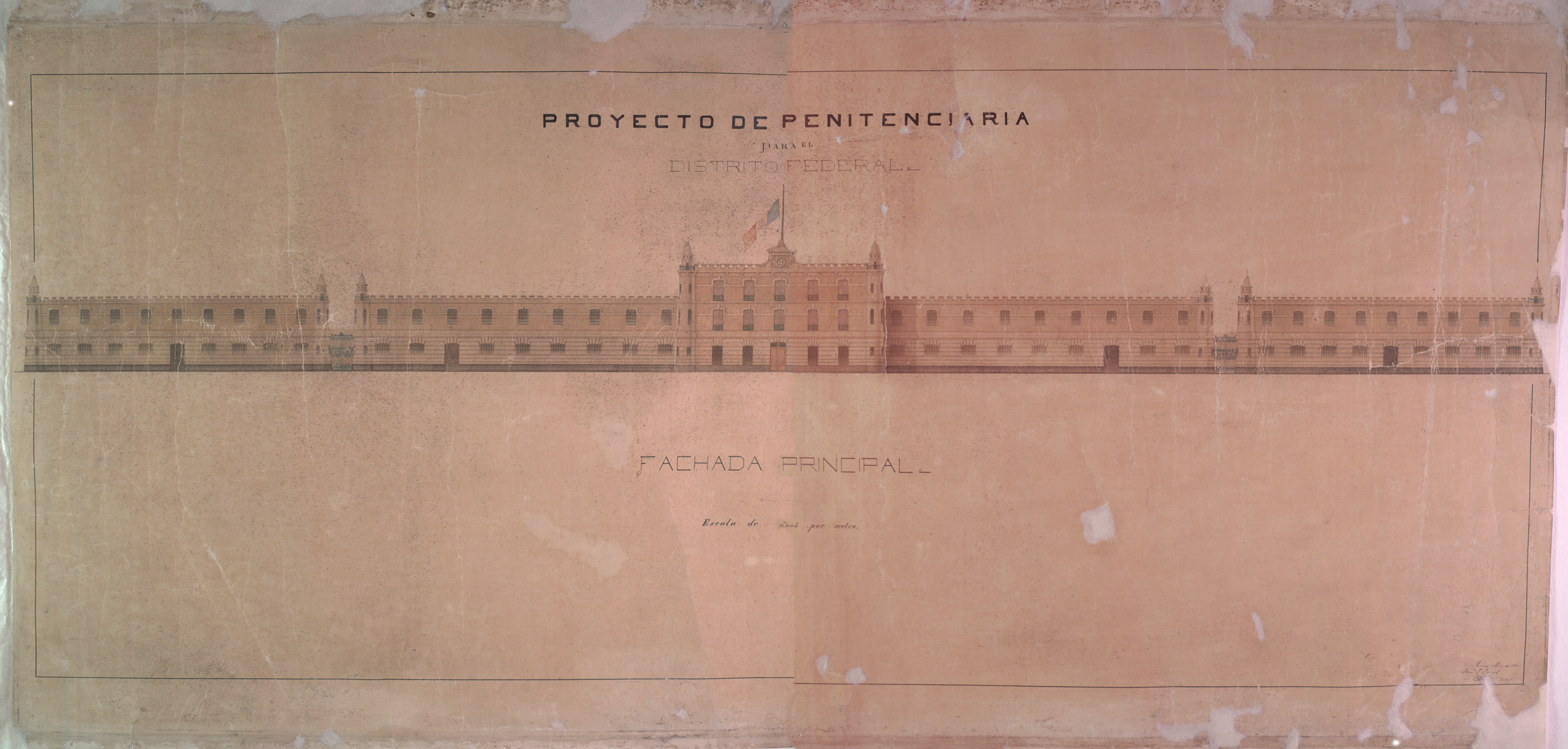
Blueprint of the Lecumberri Prison

Mexico City's main jail was a former convent, Belem Prison, that was repurposed several times before becoming a prison for both women and men. It was filthy, poorly run, and a symbol of the order. Plans were drawn up for the construction of a new facility, a penitentiary designed to rehabilitate its prisoners. Designed as a panopticon based on plans by Jeremy Bentham, Lecumberri penitentiary was opened in 1900. Mexican officials were cognizant of changes in the idea of prison as well as newly focused on collecting crime statistics.

== Culture ==
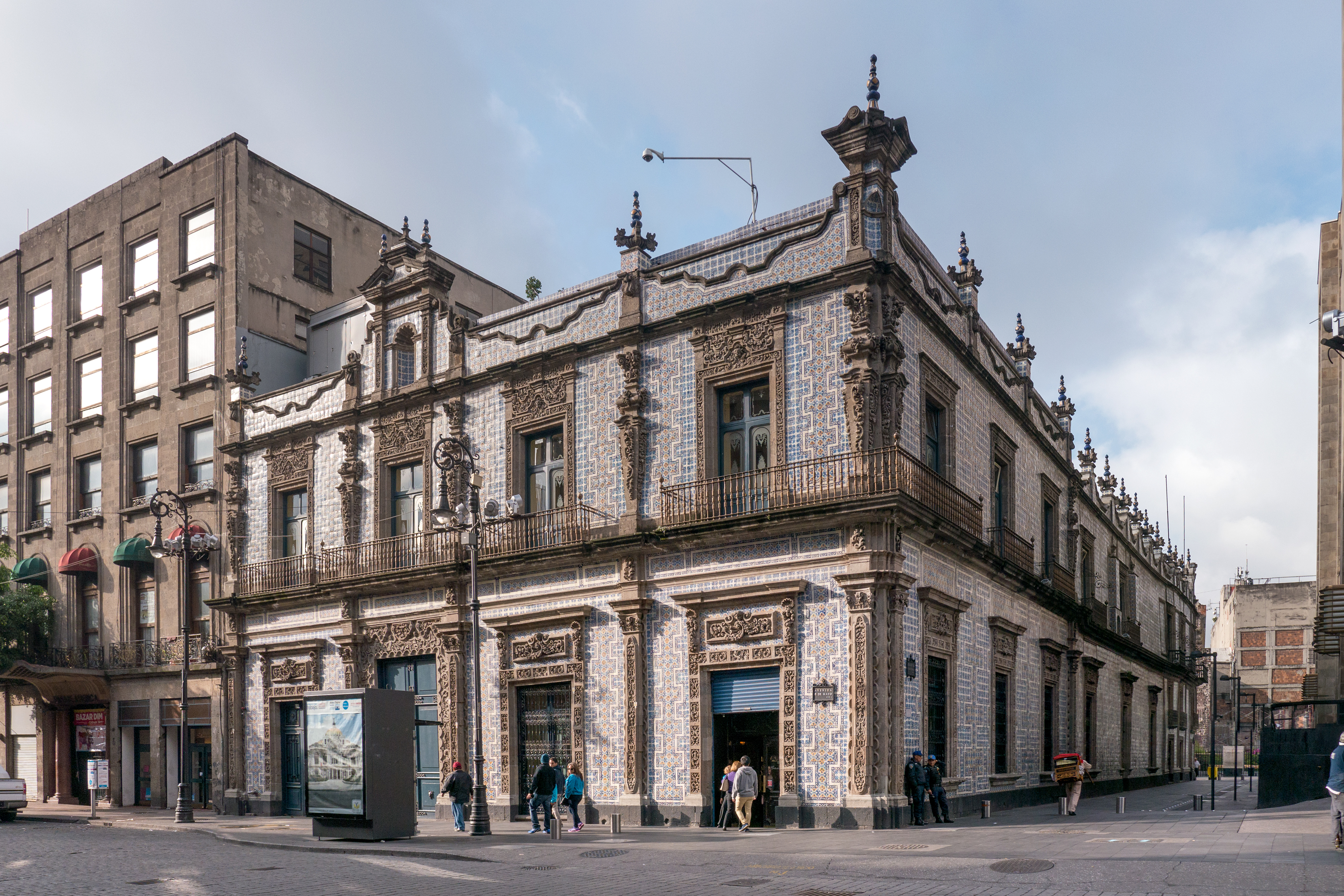
House of Tiles, Mexico City, site of the Jockey Club during the Porfiriato

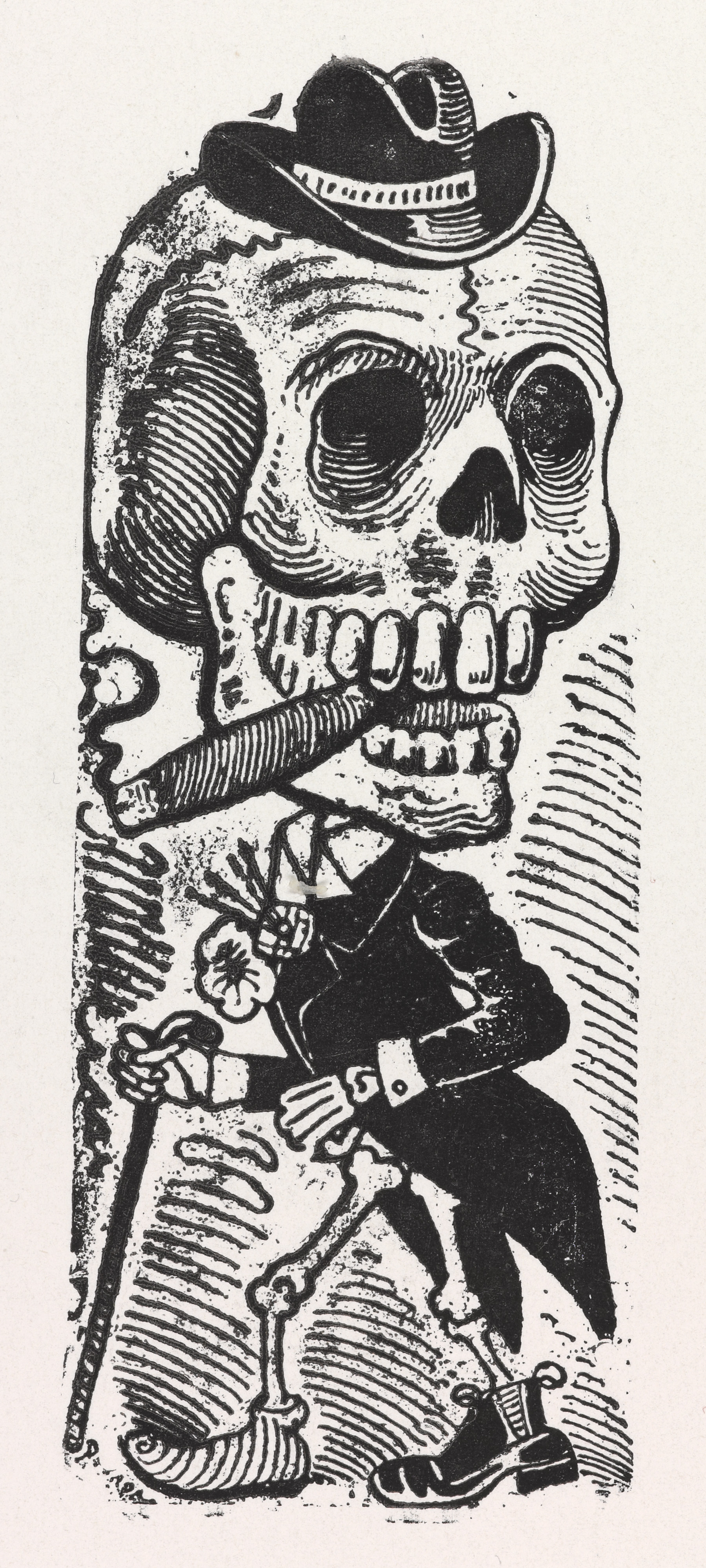
Posada mocks the style of elite men

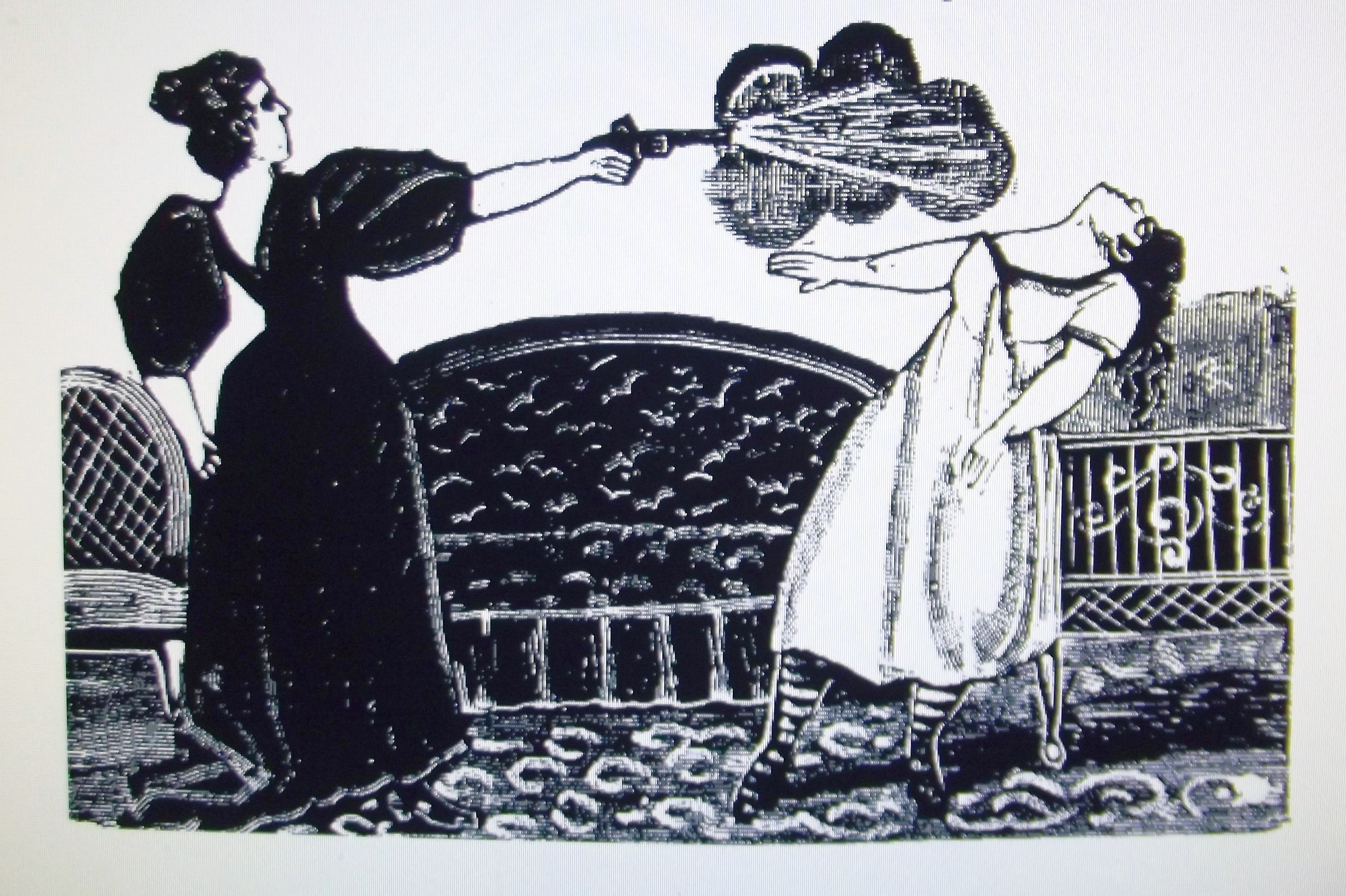
María Villa, purportedly a prostitute, shot her rival and was imprisoned for twenty years.

During the Porfiriato, urban Mexican elites became more cosmopolitan, with their consumer tastes for imported fashion styles and goods being considered an indicator of Mexico's modernity, with France being the embodiment of the sophistication they admired. Since the French had invaded Mexico and occupied it during the 1860s, Mexico's turn toward France was not without controversy in Mexico. France was a major European power and with the fall of Napoleon III in 1870, the way was opened to reestablish normal relations between the countries. With the resumption of diplomatic relations, Mexico enthusiastically embraced French styles. Department stores, such as the Palacio de Hierro, were modeled on those in Paris (Bon Marché) and London (Harrods). French influence on culture in fashion, art, and architecture is evident in the capital and other major Mexican cities, with Mexican elites enthusiastic for French styles known as Afrancesados.

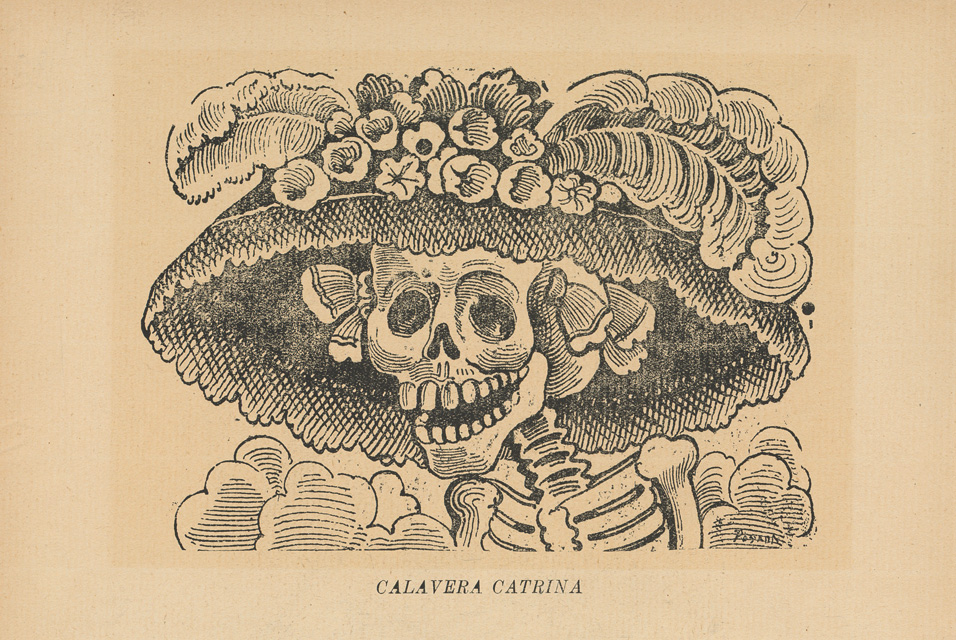
La Calavera Catrina, José Guadalupe Posada mocks the style of elite Mexican women

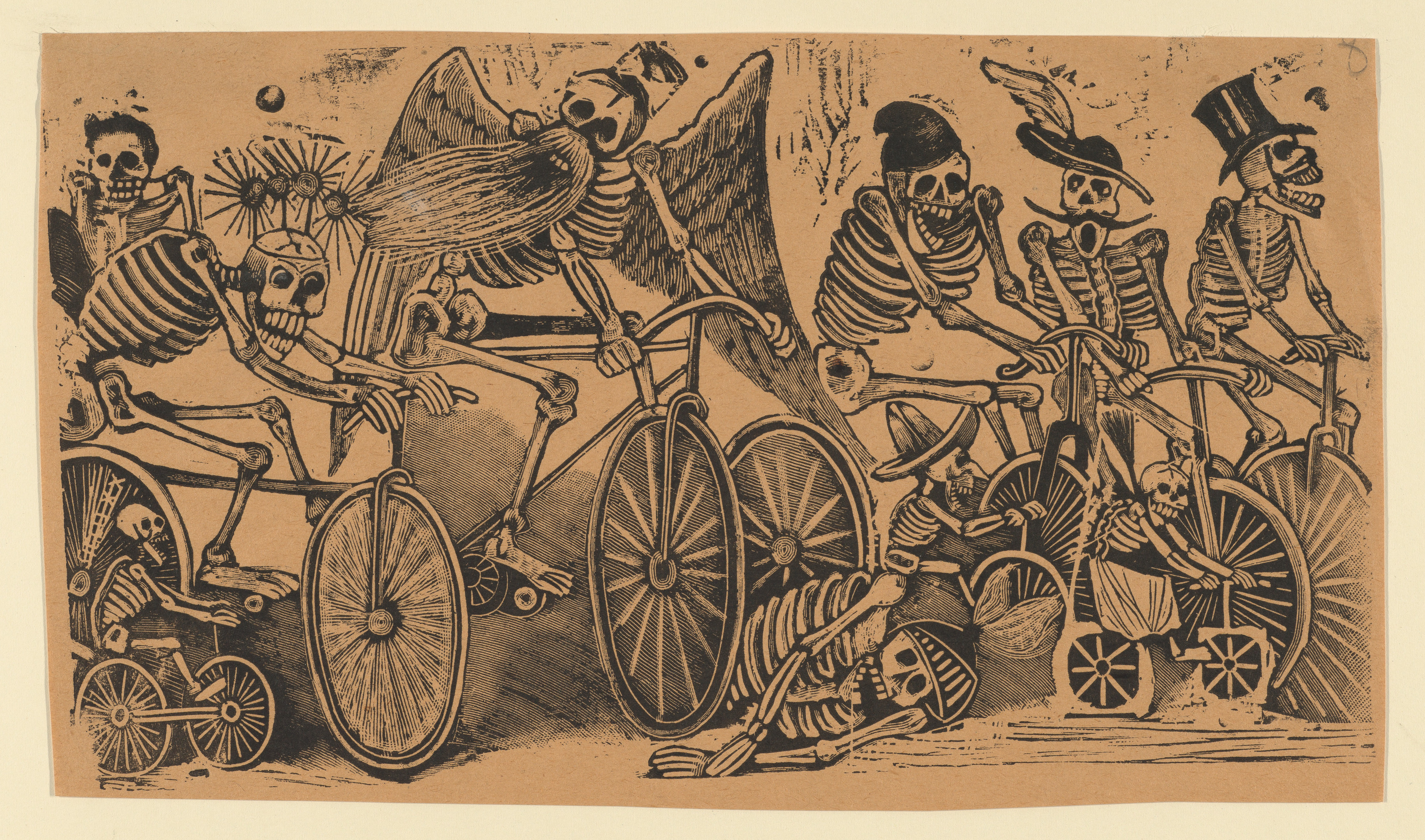
Satirical print by José Guadalupe Posada with bicyclists labeled with the names of Mexico City newspapers

Among the elites, horse racing became popular and purpose-built race tracks were constructed, such as the Hippodrome of Peralvillo, built by the newly formed Jockey Club. The club hired an architect who attended race events in Europe and the U.S. to design and build the track, which was to be opened on Easter Sunday 1882, a distinctly non-religious way to celebrate the holiday. At the delayed opening, the President of the Republic (1880–82), Manuel González, his cabinet, and the diplomatic corps, along with Mexicans who could afford the entry, watched horses owned by gentlemen compete for purses. The Jockey Club was founded in 1881, modeled on those in Europe. Mexico City's occupied the top floor of the eighteenth-century former residence of the Count of Orizaba known as the House of the Tiles. The club provided a place for elite social gatherings. Among the directors of the Jockey Club were Manuel Romero Rubio and José Yves Limantour, Díaz's closest advisors, and President González and Díaz himself as members. The Jockey Club had rooms for smoking, dining rooms, weapons, bowling, poker and baccarat.

There were upscale gambling houses that were regulated by the government. One was in the former Palace of the Emperor Iturbide, which in the late nineteenth century was a hotel. Entertainment among men of the urban popular classes included traditional sports of cockfighting and bullfighting. Bicycles were imported from Paris and Boston to Mexico City in 1869, just after the French Intervention. A French company imported bicycles and set up a rental business, but the sport took off when the technology improved in the 1890s with wheels of equal size and pneumatic tires. Bicycle clubs and organized races made their appearance soon after. Organized sports with rules, equality of competition, bureaucracy and formal record keeping became hallmarks of modernity. Although men dominated the sport, women also participated. For women especially, bicycling challenged traditional behavior, demeanor, and fashions, freeing them from being closely supervised shut-ins. Riding a bicycle required better women's clothing, and many adopted Bloomers for riding. In 1898, cartoon montage in the satirical publication El Hijo del Ahuizote answered the question "why go by bicycle?": for amusement, for pleasure in the streets, and one panel shows a bicycle on its side with a couple embracing, with the caption "for love." Cycling was touted as promoting exercise and good hygiene and was associated with modernity, speed, and modernization through technology.

== Religion ==
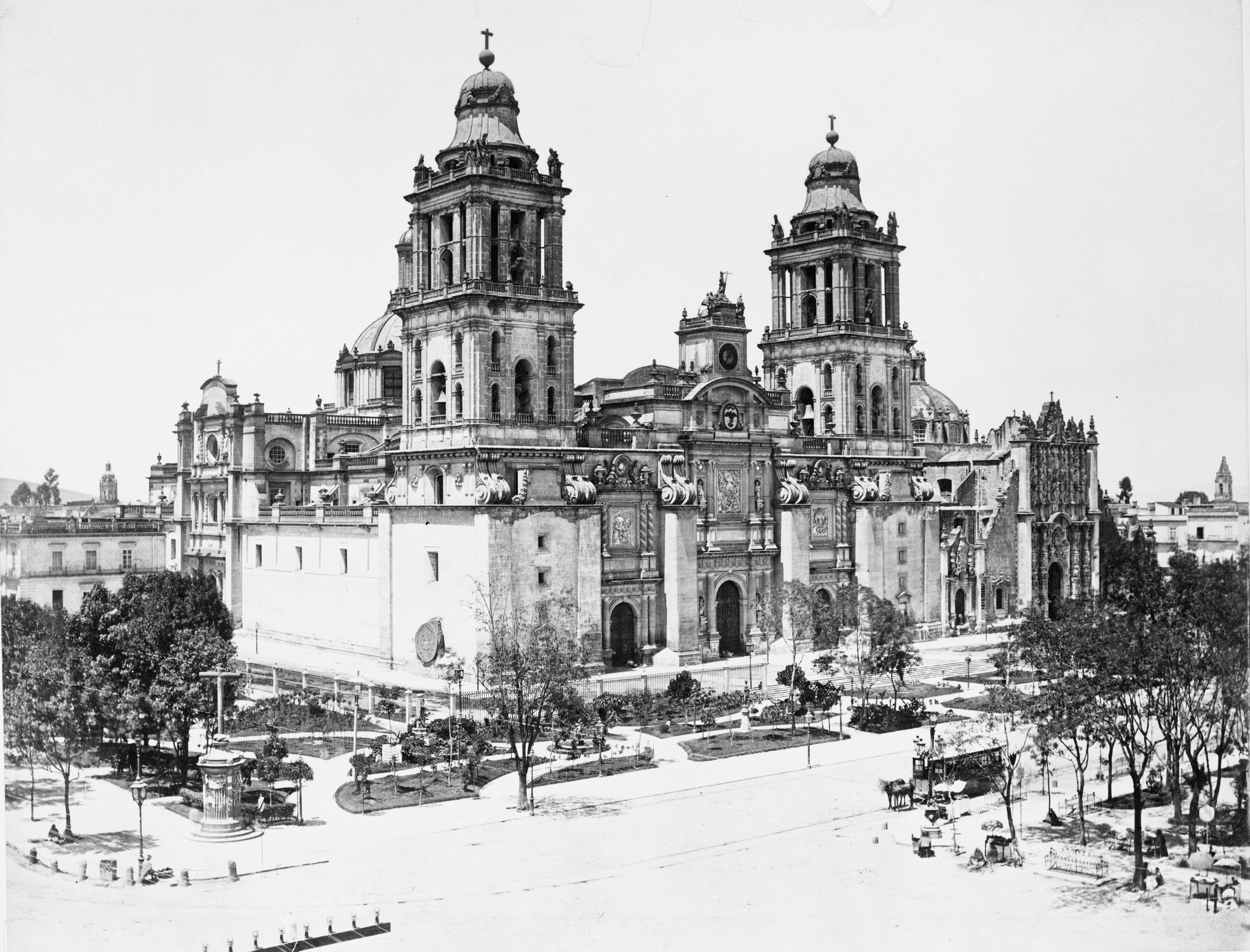
The Mexico City Metropolitan Cathedral, c. 1880. Photo by Abel Briquet. Note the Aztec sun stone up against the cathedral wall under the bell tower.

The mid-nineteenth century had been riven by conflict between the Catholic Church and the liberal State. The liberals' Mexican Constitution of 1857 had established separation of church and state, and there were strong anti-clerical articles of the constitution. As a pragmatic politician, Díaz did not want to re-open outright conflict between his regime and the Catholic Church in Mexico. His marriage to Carmen Romero Rubio, who was a faithful Catholic, helped to mend the rift. Díaz never had the anticlerical articles of the constitution repealed, but he did not strictly enforce them, so that the Catholic Church made a political and economic comeback during the Porfiriato. U.S. Protestant missionaries made inroads in Mexico during the Porfiriato, particularly in the north, but did not significantly challenge the power of Catholicism in Mexico.

In a number of regions of Mexico, local religious cults and dissident peasant movements arose, which the Catholic Church considered idolatrous. Responding to the potential loss of the faithful in Mexico and elsewhere, Pope Leo XIII issued the encyclical Rerum Novarum, calling on the Church to become involved in social problems. In Mexico, some Catholic laymen supported the abolition of debt peonage on landed estates, which kept peasants tied to work there because they were unable to pay off their debts. The Church itself had lost lands during the Liberal Reform in the mid-nineteenth century, so it could voice support for the peasants' plight. The Church's success in the new initiatives can be seen as Zapatistas in Morelos carried out no anticlerical actions during the Mexican Revolution, and many fighters wore the Virgin of Guadalupe on their hats.

== Historical memory ==
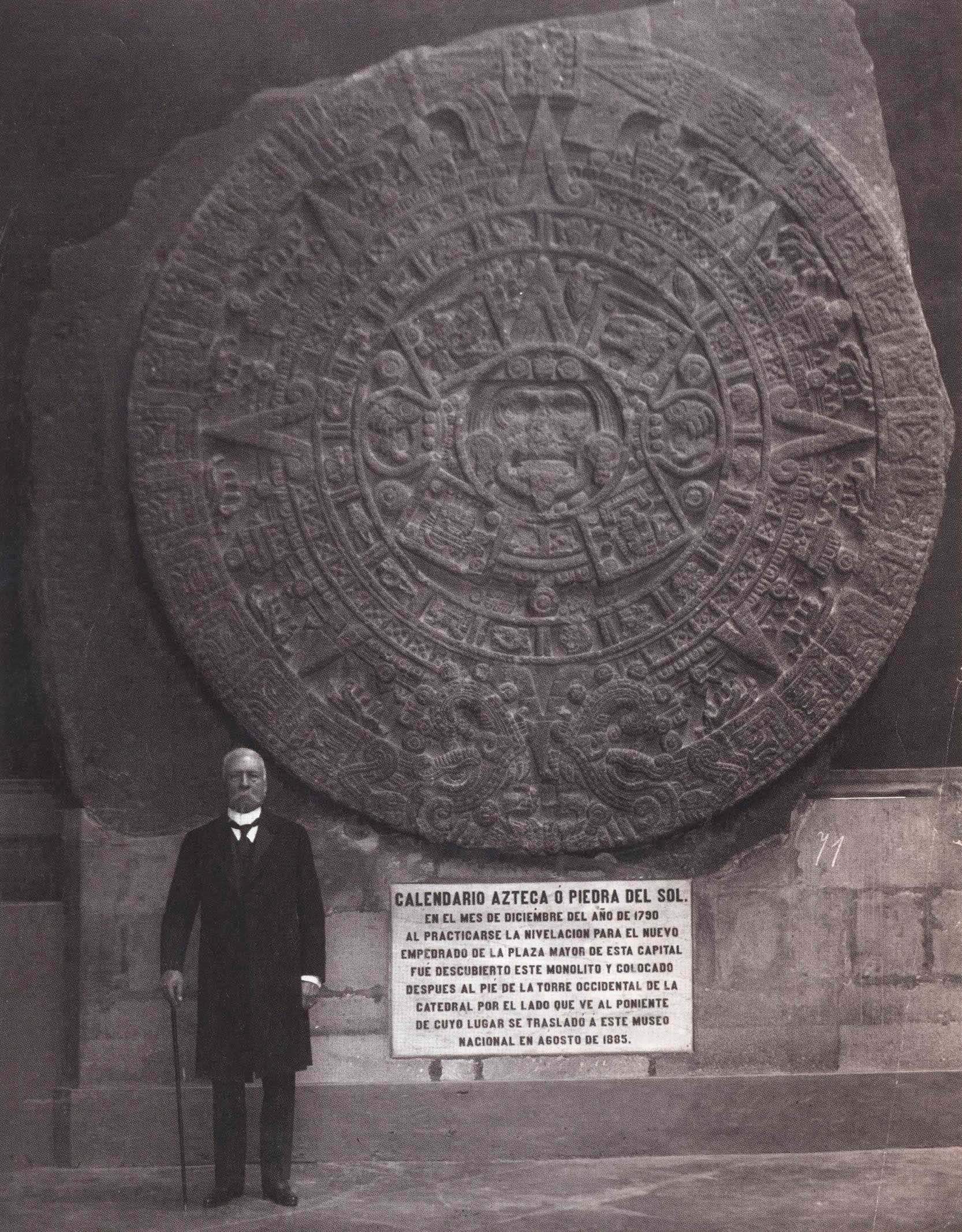
Porfirio Díaz in 1910 at the National Museum of Anthropology with the Aztec sun stone. It was previously on display in the open air, up against the Mexico City Metropolitan Cathedral wall.

During the Díaz regime, the state began to take control over the cultural patrimony of Mexico, expanding the National Museum of Anthropology as the central repository of artifacts from Mexico's archeological sites, as well as asserting control over the sites themselves. The Law of Monuments (1897) gave jurisdiction over archeological sites to the federal government. This allowed the expropriation and expulsion of peasants who had been cultivating crops on the archeological sites, most systematically done at Teotihuacan. Former cavalry officer and archeologist Leopoldo Batres was Inspector of Archeological Monuments and wielded considerable power. He garnered resources from the Díaz government funds to guard archeological sites in central Mexico and Yucatan, as well as to hire workers to excavate archeological sites of particular importance for creating an image of Mexico's glorious past to foreign scholars and tourists, as well as patriotic fervor in Mexico.

Along the wide, tree-lined boulevard, Paseo de la Reforma, laid out by Emperor Maximilian between the National Palace and Chapultepec Castle, was transformed as a site of historical memory, with statues commemorating figures of Mexican history and important historical events.

== 1910 Centennial of Independence ==
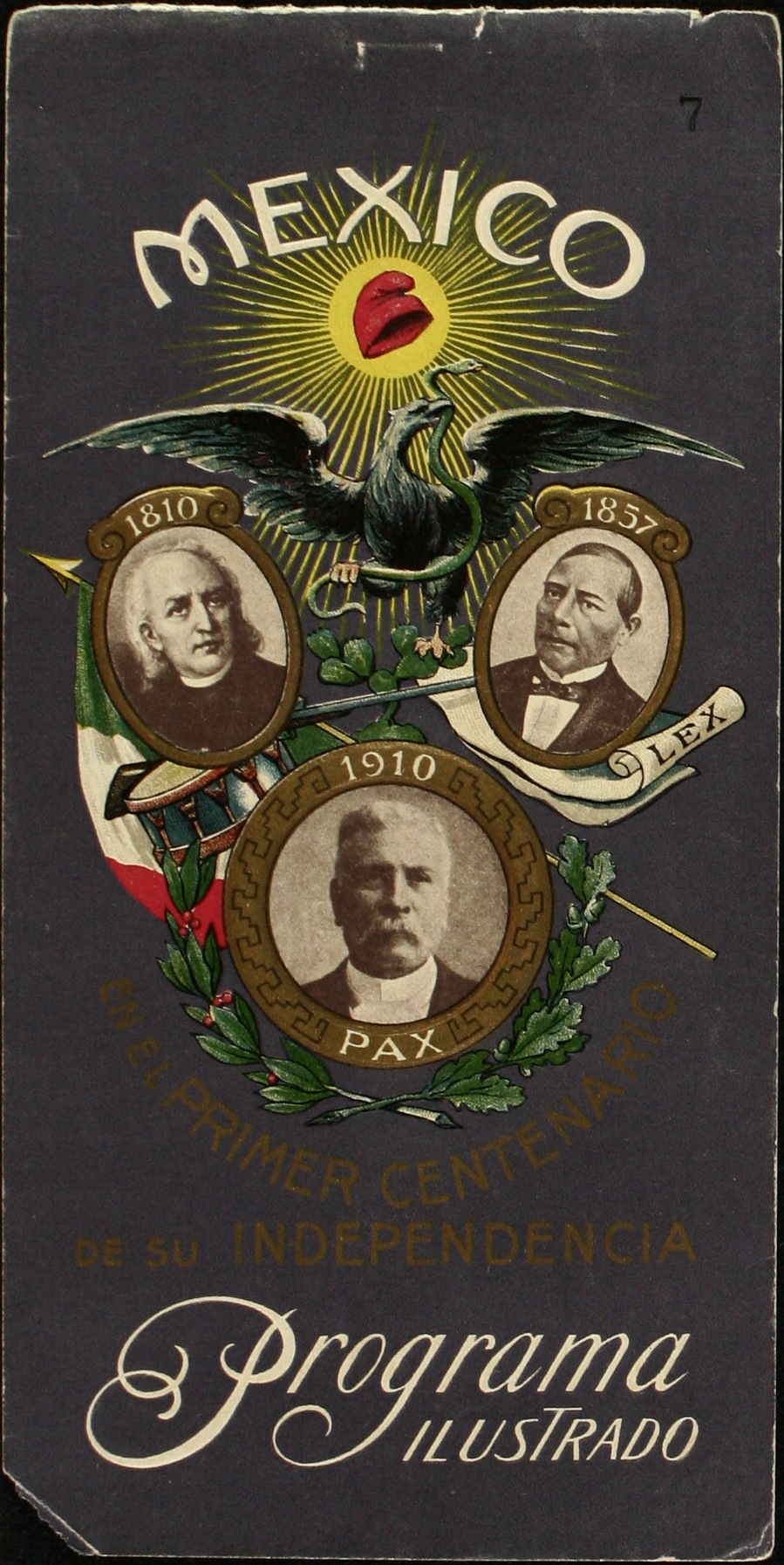
Illustrated program of the official centennial festivities over 30 days in September 1910

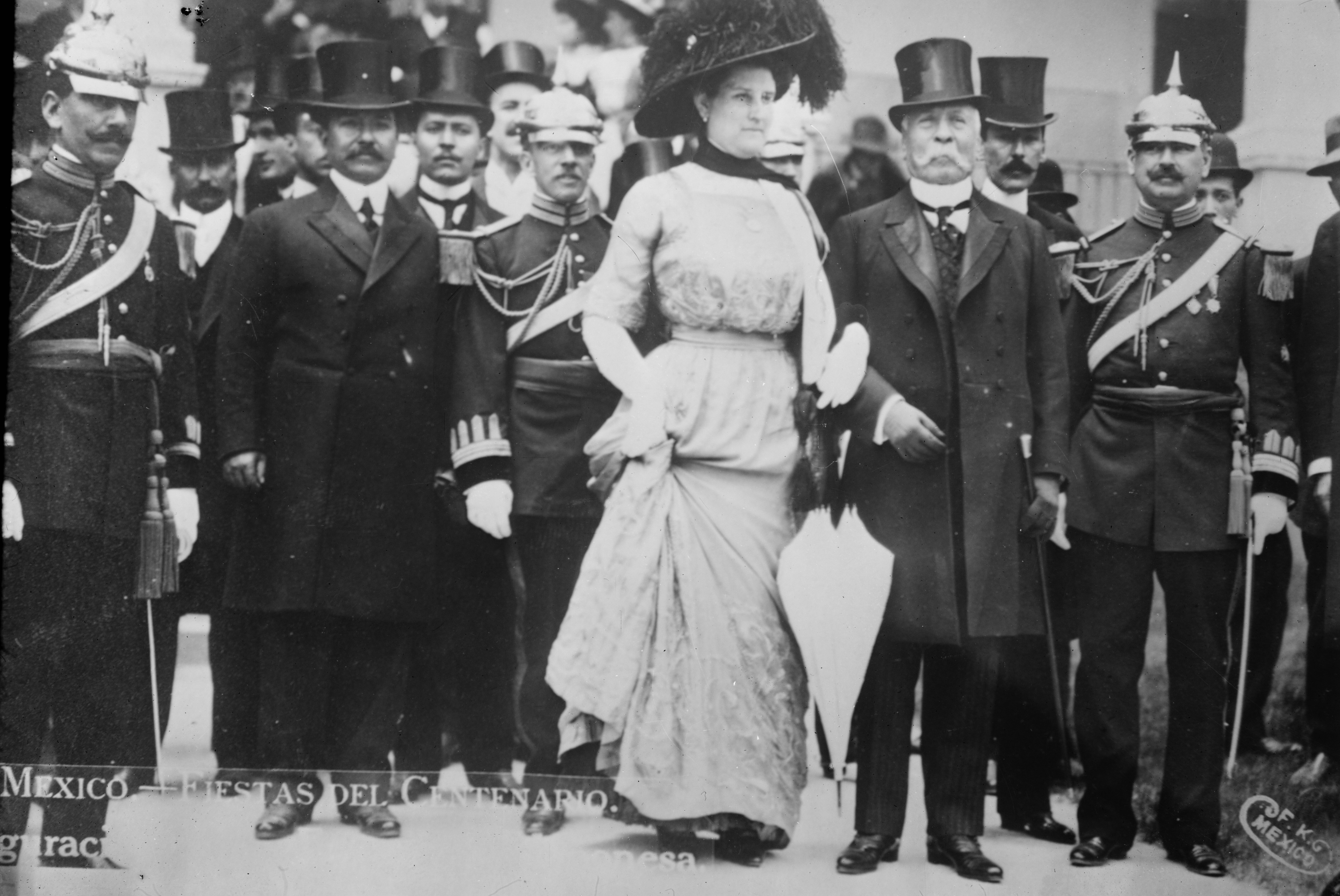
Porfirio Díaz and his second wife Carmen Romero Rubio photographed with others celebrating the centennial of Mexican independence in 1910

The official centennial festivities were concentrated in the month of September, but there were events during the centennial year outside of September. In September the central core of Mexico City was decorated and lit with electric lights many bedecked with flowers. Immediately following the centennial month, there was a book published, detailing the day by day events of the festivities, which included inaugurations of buildings and statues, receptions for dignitaries, military parades, and allegorical and historical processions.

The high points of the celebrations were on 15 September, Díaz's 80th birthday, and 16 September, the centennial of Hidalgo's Grito de Dolores, considered the starting point of Mexico's struggle for independence in 1810. On Friday, 15 September, the day was marked by a huge parade representing the arc of Mexican history, focusing on the 1519 conquest of Mexico, the struggle for independence in the early nineteenth century, and the liberal reform of the mid-nineteenth century. There were allegorical floats depicting the insurgent army of independence, independence martyr Father José María Morelos, and for the modern era commerce, industry, and banking. At 11 p.m. Díaz stood on the balcony of the National Palace and with the ringing of the bell from Father Hidalgo's church in Dolores, Díaz proclaimed "Viva Mexico". On 16 September, Díaz with an array of dignitaries attending inaugurated, the Monument to Independence at a major intersection (glorieta) of Paseo de la Reforma. Some 10,000 Mexican troops and contingents of foreign soldiers marched at the monument as part of the inaugural ceremonies.

Another major September activity included Díaz's inauguration on 18 September of the monument to Benito Juárez at the edge of the Alameda Central. Although a political rival in life, Díaz helped memorialize Juárez's contributions to Mexico. At the ceremony, the French ambassador returned the ceremonial keys of Mexico City that were given to General Forey in 1863 during the French Intervention. The French invasion had disrupted Juárez's presidency, forcing his government into domestic exile while the French occupied Mexico.

Díaz inaugurated a new insane asylum in Mixcoac on the first of September. On 2 September, the pillar of the baptismal font in Hidalgo's church was brought to the capital with great ceremony and placed in the National Museum, with some 25,000 children viewing the event. Many nations participated in the celebrations, including Japan, whose pavilion Díaz inaugurated. An important issue for the modernizing Mexican state was health and hygiene, and an exhibition was inaugurated on 2 September. Díaz's Minister of the Interior, Ramón Corral ceremonially laid the first stone of a new penitentiary. On Sunday, 4 September, there was a parade with allegorical floats, which Díaz and his whole cabinet viewed. On September 6 some 38,000 school children honored the Mexican flag. Diaz inaugurated the new building of the Young Men's Christian Association (YMCA) in Mexico City, a Protestant voluntary association. A new normal school to train teachers was inaugurated with Diaz and foreign delegates attending. Also occurring during the festivities was the Nation Congress of Pedagogy.

The Spanish monarchy sent a special ambassador to the festivities, who was enthusiastically received. Díaz gave an enormous reception in his honor. On 9 September Díaz laid the first stone on a monument to Isabel the Catholic and Díaz also opened an exhibition of colonial-era Spanish art. The Spanish ambassador, the Marquis of Polavieja returned items of historical importance to Mexico, including the uniform of Father Morelos, a portrait, and other relics of independence in a ceremony at the National Palace, with the diplomatic corps in attendance, as well as Mexican army officers. The king of Spain conveyed through his special ambassador the honor of the Order of Charles III on Díaz, the highest distinction for sovereigns and heads of state. Others holding the honor were the Russian czar, and the monarchs of Germany and Austria. A portrait of Spanish monarch Charles III was unveiled in the Salon of Ambassadors in the National Palace.

The International Congress of Americanists met in Mexico City, with Porfirio Díaz elected its honorary president. Prominent Americanists from many countries attended, including Eduard Seler from Germany and Franz Boaz from the U.S. Mexican Secretary of Education, Justo Sierra attended. Díaz and Justo Sierra went with Congress attendees to the archeological site of San Juan Teotihuacan. On 8 September, as part of the historical commemorations of the centennial, there was homage paid to the Niños Héroes, the cadets who died defending Chapultepec Castle from the invading American forces during the Mexican–American War. But Díaz also laid the first stone to a monument to George Washington in the American Colony in Mexico City. The American delegation hosted a sumptuous banquet for fellow delegates. There was a large number of journalists from the U.S. attending the celebrations, such as The New York Times, the New York Evening Post, Harper's Weekly, The Washington Post, as well as some from Toronto and Montreal in Canada, with the American ambassador hosting a reception for these North American newspapermen. Other statues that were inaugurated were one honoring France's Louis Pasteur and Germany's Alexander von Humboldt. The German government had an honor guard for the monument of German naval officers.

== Coup d'état and end of Porfiriato, 1910–1911 ==
The centenary celebrations were the swansong of Díaz's regime. Presidential-challenger Francisco I. Madero had been jailed during the 1910 presidential elections, but he escaped north across the U.S. border in Texas. While still in Mexico, he issued the Plan of San Luis Potosí in October 1910, which denounced the election as fraudulent and called for a rebellion against what he considered Díaz's illegitimate regime. Fighting broke out in the state of Morelos, just south of Mexico City, as well as on the border with the U.S. in Ciudad Juárez. The Mexican Federal Army was incapable of putting down these disparate uprisings. Opposition to Díaz grew, since his regime was not able to restore civil order. Díaz had failed to secure the presidential succession. Political rivals, General Bernardo Reyes, who had a fiefdom in northern Mexico encompassing Coahuila, Tamaulipas, and Nuevo León, and Minister of Finance and leader of the Científicos, José Yves Limantour, were shut out of the succession, with Díaz choosing Ramón Corral as his vice president. Reyes accepted exile and went to Europe, on a mission to study the military in Germany. Although Reyes had been a political rival, according to one historian, exiling him was a serious political miscalculation, since he was loyal and effective and the political opposition was growing, adding to the anti-reelectionists.

Limantour was in Europe renegotiating Mexico's debt, leaving Díaz increasingly isolated politically. Díaz began negotiating with Madero's uncle Ernesto Madero, promising reforms if peace were restored. He also began informal negotiations with anti-reelectionist rebels in early 1911. Díaz refused to resign, which re-ignited the armed rebellion against him, particularly in Chihuahua led by Pascual Orozco and Pancho Villa. Faced with this situation, Díaz agreed to the Treaty of Ciudad Juárez, which largely left the Porfirian state intact. The treaty specified that Diaz resign along with vice president Corral, and created an interim regime under Francisco León de la Barra in advance of new elections. Rebel forces were to demobilize. Díaz and most of his family sailed to France into exile. He died in Paris in 1915. As he left Mexico, he reportedly prophesied that "Madero has released a tiger, let us see if he can control it."

== See also ==
- Cananea strike
- Científicos
- Economic history of Mexico
- El Hijo del Ahuizote
- History of democracy in Mexico
- John Kenneth Turner
- Plan of Tuxtepec
- Porfirionism
- Río Blanco strike
