= Abel Briquet =

French pioneer of photography

Alfred Briquet
- Born: Alfred Saint-Ange Briquet; 30 December 1833; Paris, France
- Died: 1926 (aged 92－93); Mexico
- Occupation: photographer

Alfred Saint-Ange Briquet (30 December 1833, Paris – 1926, Mexico) was a French pioneer of photography, particularly in Mexico.

== Biography ==
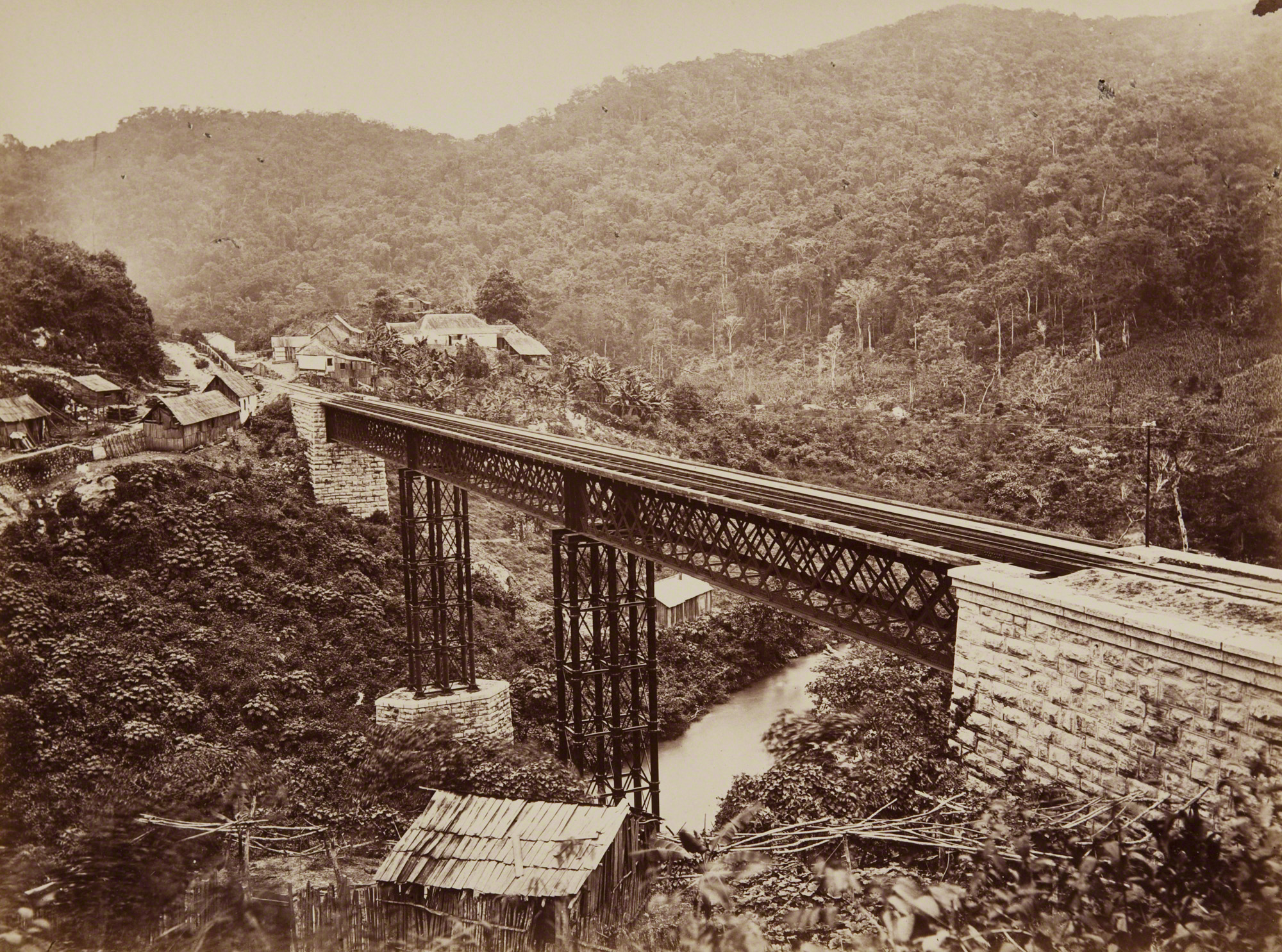
FNM Bridge over Rio Balsas, 1883

Briquet became a photographer in Paris in 1854. He taught photography at École spéciale militaire de Saint-Cyr, the prominent French military academy.

He closed his studio in Paris in 1865, but it not certain when he started work in Mexico, however in 1876, he did receive a commission to record the construction of the Mexican National Railway (Ferrocarril Nacional Mexicano - FNM) line being built between Veracruz and Mexico City. He gained the attention of President Porfirio Díaz and secured a number of commissions. He also published a series of photography books: Vistas Mexicanas, Tipos Mexicanos and Antiquedades Mexicanos. Following the Mexican Revolution of 1910 he no longer received any government contracts.

His photos appeared in several books, and albums among them we can mention "Mexico artístico y pintoresco" edited by Julio Michaud and "Mexico, Its Social Evolution" coordinated by the historian Justo Sierra.

== Gallery ==
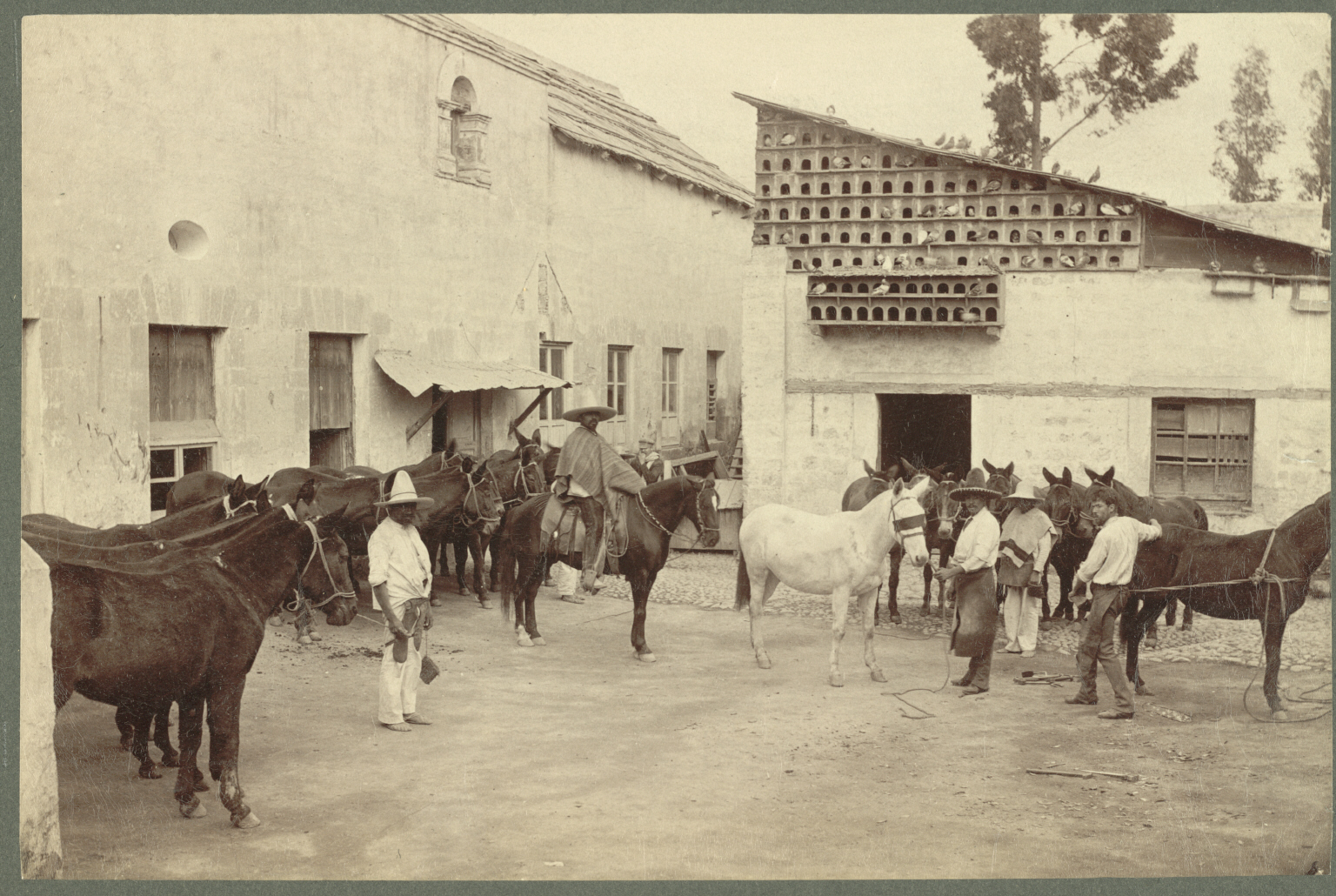
Shoeing the Mules (Mexican Village Scene)

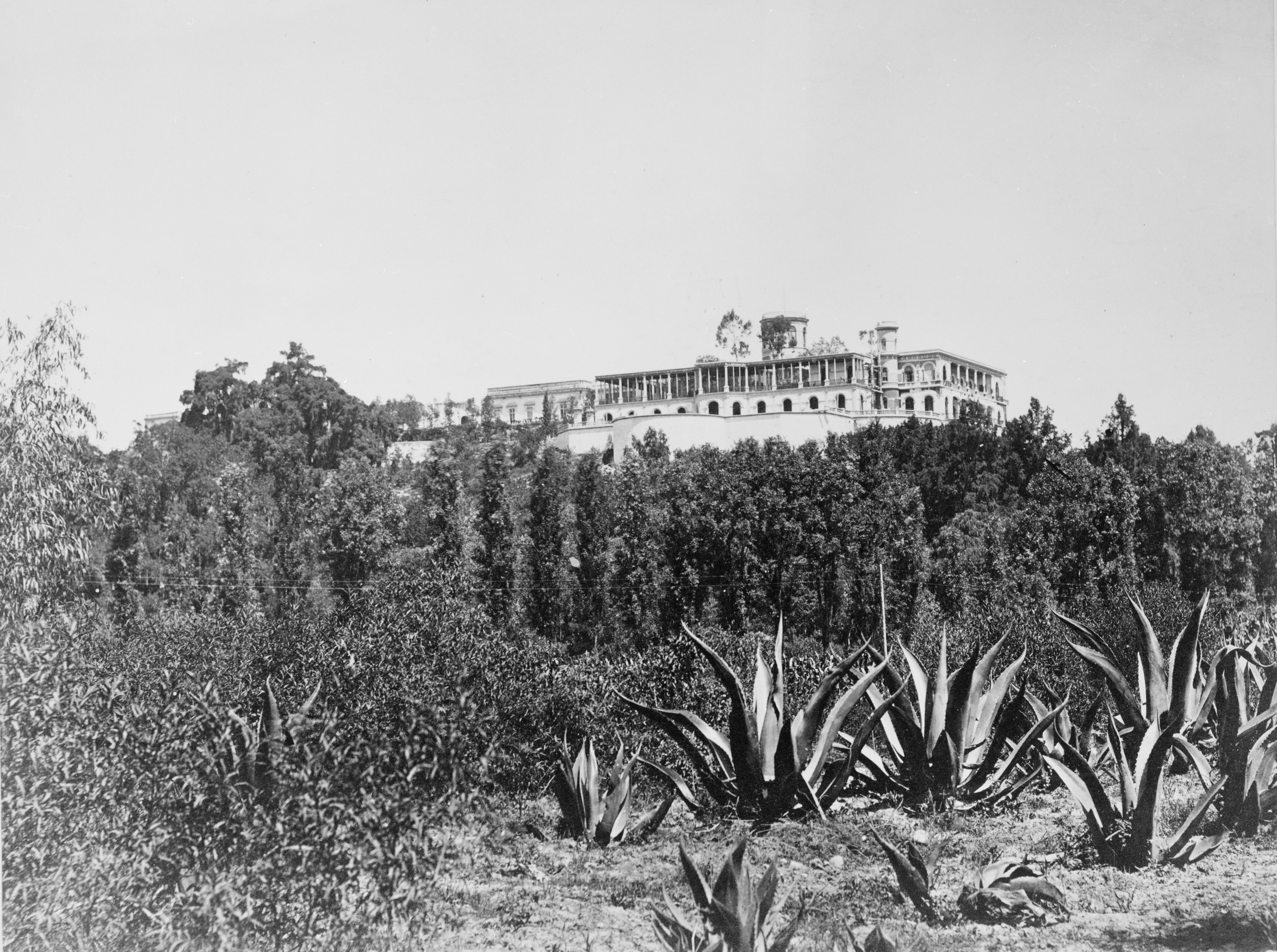
Chapultepec Castle between 1880 and 1900

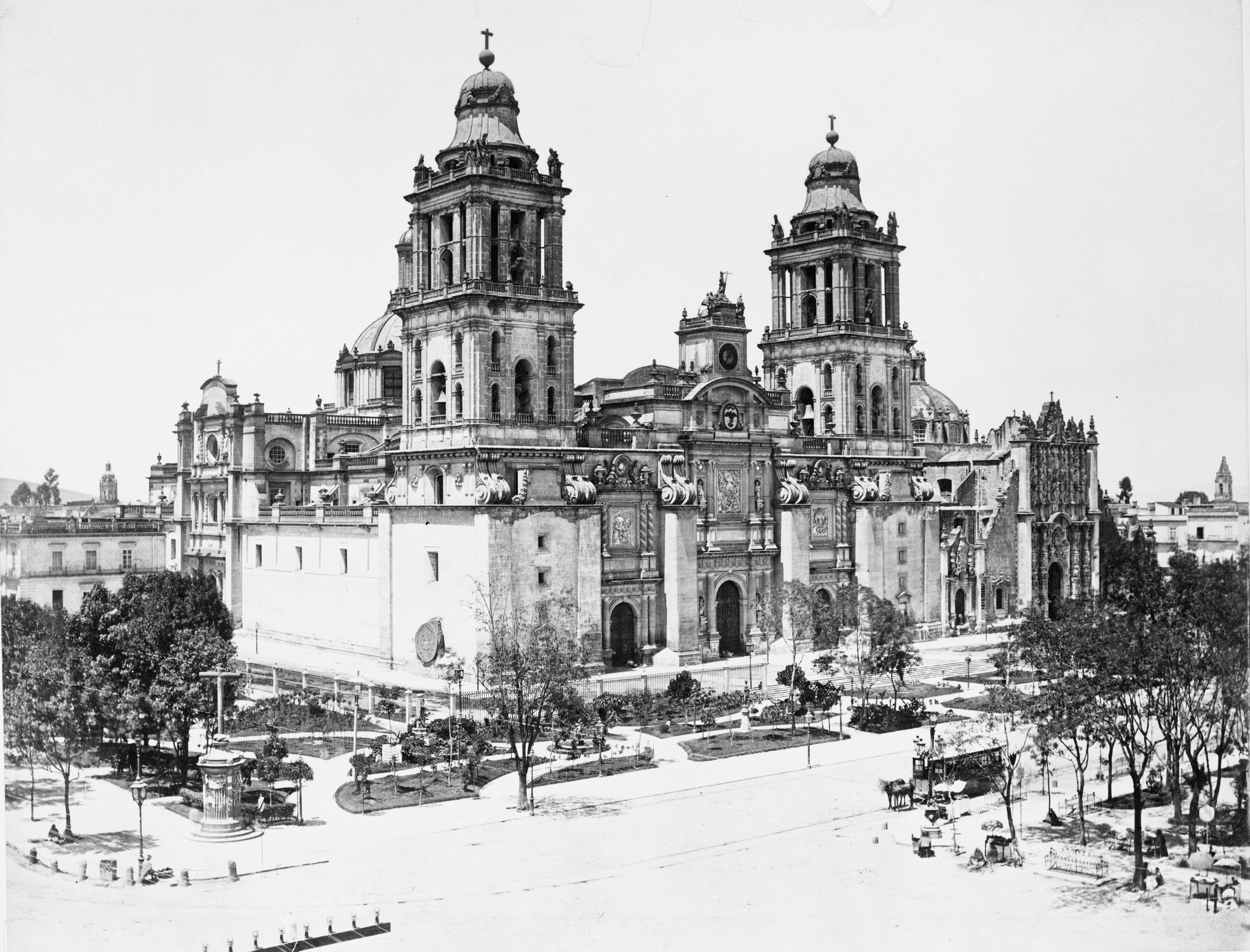
Mexico City Metropolitan Cathedral between 1880 and 1900

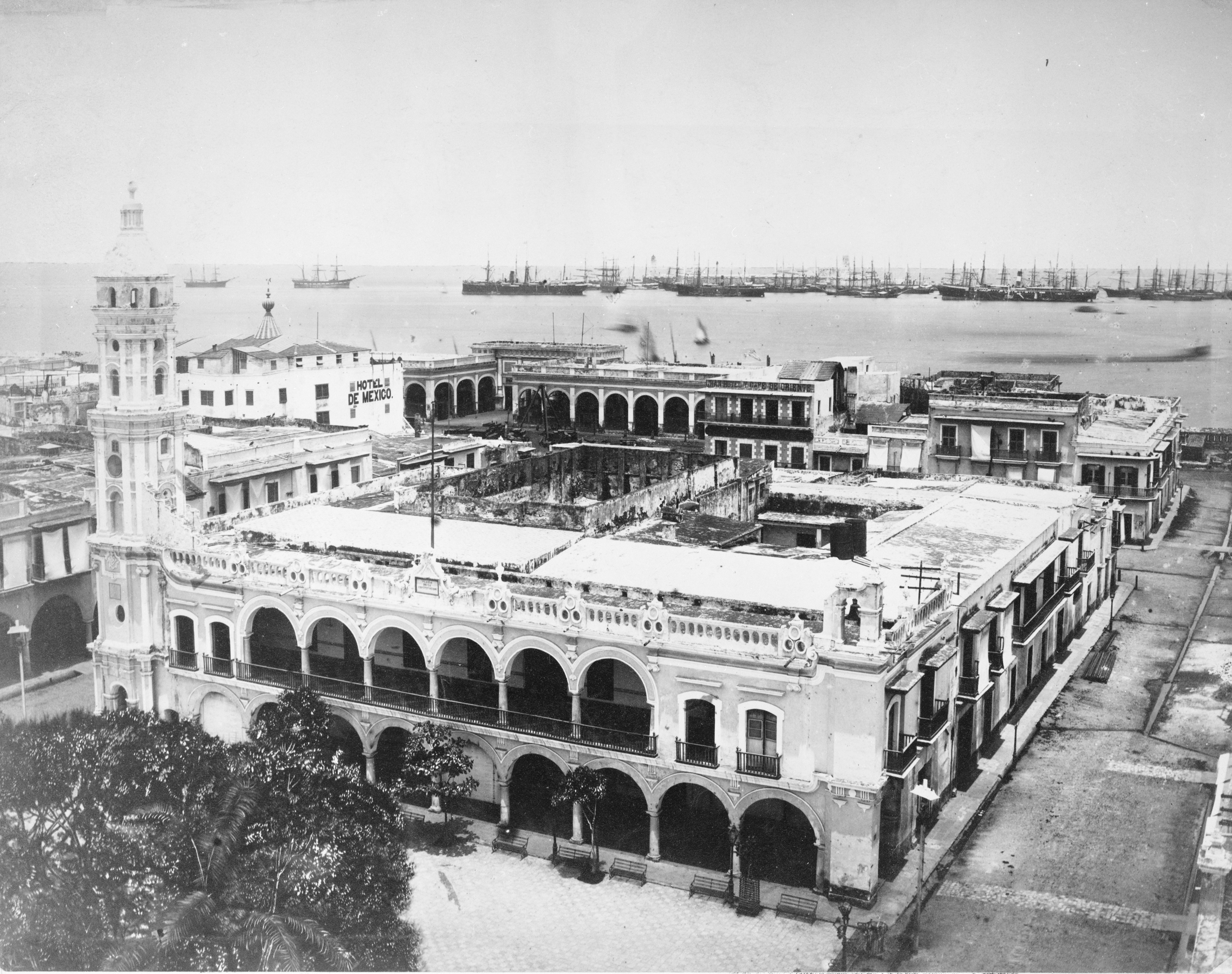
Municipal Palace of Veracruz between 1880 and 1900

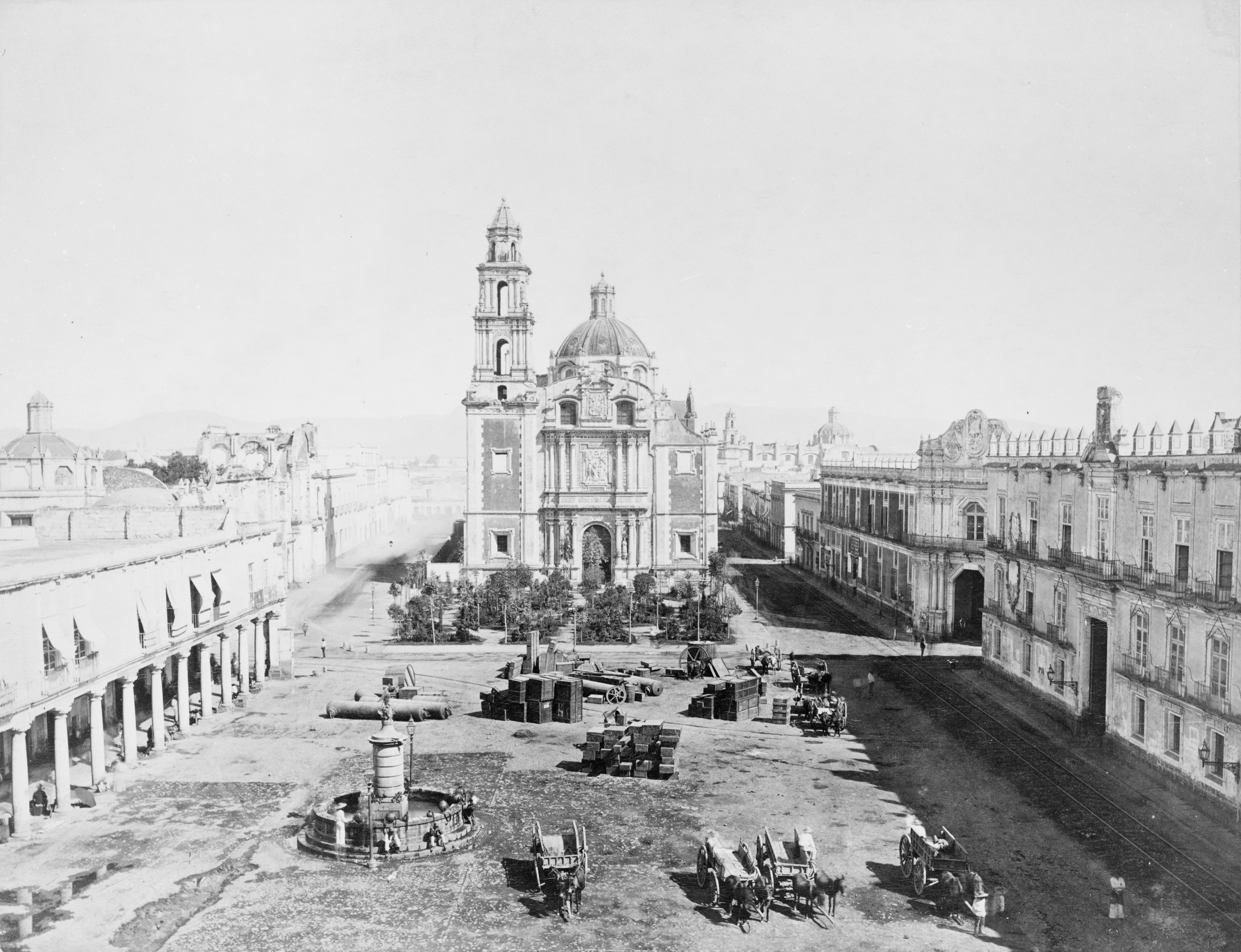
Santo Domingo Square, Mexico City in 1900

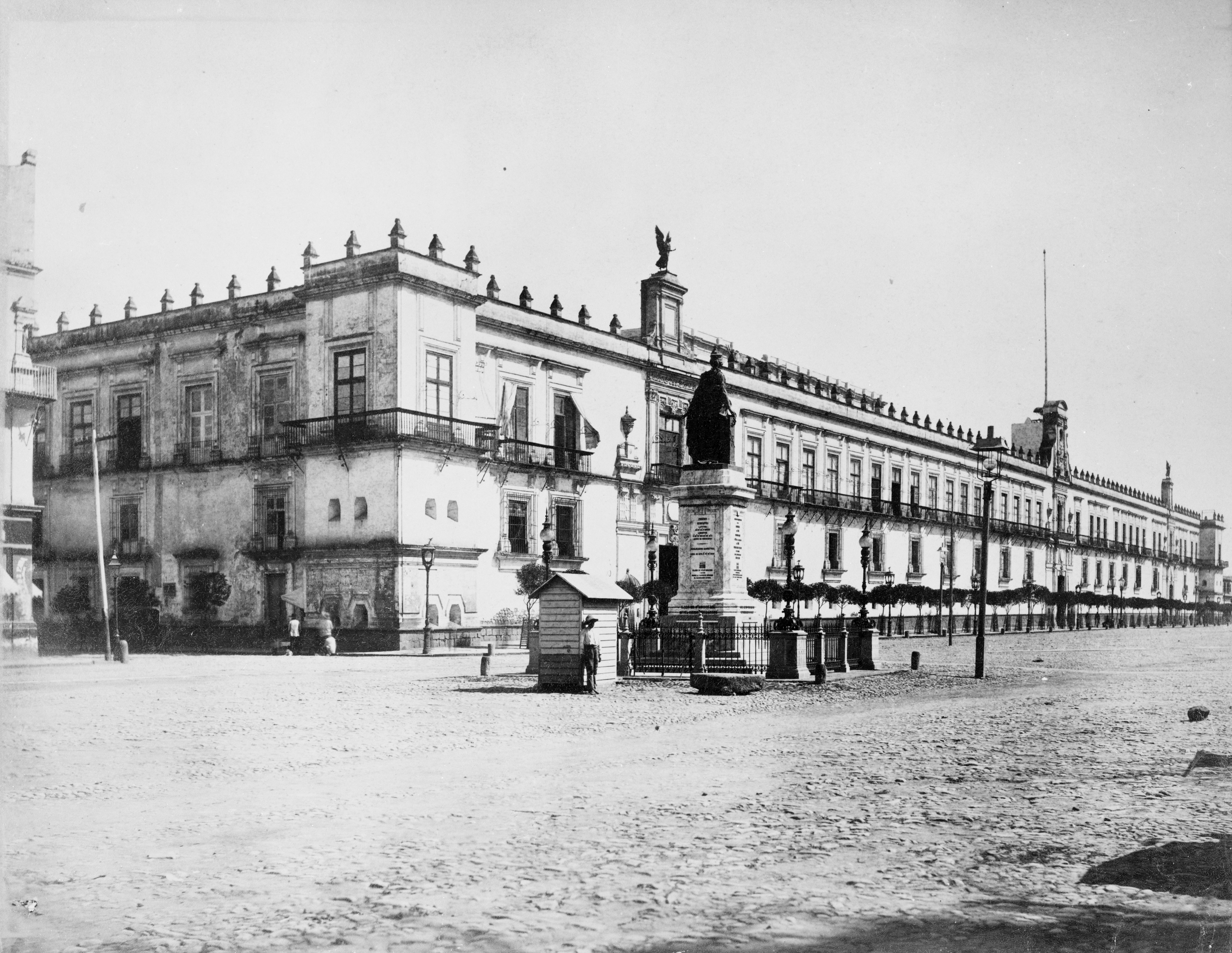
National Palace, Mexico City in 1900
