= Río Blanco strike =

Historical workers strike in Mexico

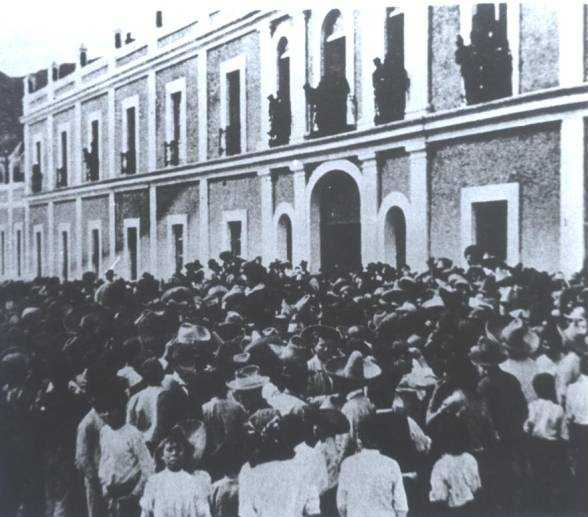
Río Blanco strike, 1907

The Río Blanco strike of January 7 and 8, 1907, was a workers' riot related to a textile strike that occurred in the town of Río Blanco near Orizaba in the Mexican state of Veracruz.

== Background and early stages ==
Following a two-week railroad strike in the summer of 1906, further labor unrest developed among cotton and textile workers in the neighboring states of Tlaxcala and Puebla. Central Mexican textile workers had organized as the Gran Círculo de Obreros Libres ("Great Circle of Free Workers"), and 93 of the factory owners, most of them French, had formed a trade group called Centro Industrial Mexicano. On the other side, a political party called the Partido Liberal Mexicano (PLM) had been established in 1906 and quickly became involved in assertively pressing for industrial and rural reform. At both the French-controlled Rio Blanco textile factory and the American-owned Cananea Copper Company, PLM literature was subsequently to be found in the workers' settlements.

After a Christmas Eve lockout by the owners, the administration of President Porfirio Díaz reached a temporary labor settlement. Some workers of the large Río Blanco mill near Orizaba had not joined any strike. Still, they were blacklisted, left locked out of work, and were refused access to provisions from the monopoly company store.

== Outbreak of violence ==
On January 7 a stone-throwing crowd of about 2,000 rioted, with many of the attacks focused on company property. An initial clash between strikers and Rio Blanco employees who were returning to work led to shots being fired and the burning of the company store, though not the actual factory premises. Rurales (mounted police), led by the local political jefe (official) Carlos Herrera, appeared but did not intervene.

On the same day, the mob ransacked the homes of the wealthy, released prisoners from jail, and went afield to Nogales and Necoxtla to burn and loot their company stores as well. By the end of the day, soldiers from nearby Oriziba had killed 18. Hundreds more had been arrested or chased into the surrounding hills.

== Repression ==
Federal troops from Mexico City arrived on the 8th on the personal orders of Díaz. Six strike leaders were identified by evening and executed, on the smoking ruins of the company store, the next morning. Conservative casualty figures range from 50 to 70 dead, and hundreds wounded. The relatively liberal Herrera was replaced by a hardline army colonel Francisco Ruiz as jefe. Lurid accounts of railroad wagons being sighted laden with the bodies of dead workers were circulated by political enemies of the Díaz regime.

== Aftermath ==
The Río Blanco incident became linked with the Cananea strike of June 1906 as two symbols of the Díaz administration's corruption, subservience to foreign interests, and civil repression. They became "household words for hundreds of thousands of Mexicans".

The national impact of the strike was significant in terms of damage to the image of the Diaz regime. However local conditions remained essentially unchanged. Within two days about 80% of the employees involved had returned to work and subsequent unrest soon subsided. A military garrison was established nearby but both government authorities and workers adopted a relatively passive stance during the remaining years before the outbreak of the 1910 Mexican Revolution.
