= Juana Belén Gutiérrez de Mendoza =

Mexican writer and activist (1875–1942)

- Born: María Juana Francisca Gutiérrez Chávez; 27 January 1875; San Juan del Río, Durango, Mexico
- Died: 13 July 1942 (aged 67); Mexico City, Mexico
- Occupations: Journalist, teacher

Juana Belén Gutiérrez de Mendoza (Note: This name uses Spanish naming customs: the first or paternal family name is Gutiérrez, and, for married women, the optional marital name is de Mendoza. Gutiérrez was baptized María Juana Francisca in San Juan del Río in February 1875; the origin of the assumed name "Belén" is unclear, though some theorize that she adopted it due to the many times she was held in Belem Prison.) (27 January 1875 – 13 July 1942) was a Mexican journalist, activist, revolutionary, and teacher. She is best known for her opposition to the dictatorship of Porfirio Díaz; her writings critiquing the Mexican state; and her advocacy for the rights of women, workers, and Indigenous people. She was a significant figure during the Mexican Revolution.

Gutiérrez's career as an activist began in Sierra Mojada, Coahuila, where she wrote for several newspapers criticizing the Díaz regime. Because of a report she wrote concerning the mistreatment of mine workers, she was imprisoned for a year. After her release, she joined several liberal anti-Díaz groups and, beginning in 1898, associated with various prominent liberal figures. In 1901, she moved to the city of Guanajuato and, with Elisa Acuña, began publishing the anti-Díaz and anti-clerical periodical Vésper (transl. 'Evening Star') until the local archbishop seized her press, causing her to flee to Mexico City. In 1903, she was imprisoned again and later exiled to Laredo, Texas, where she briefly joined a group of other exiled dissidents before returning to Mexico.

In the years leading up to the Mexican Revolution, Gutiérrez supported Francisco I. Madero's presidential campaign against Díaz. Following Madero's arrest, Gutiérrez participated in a failed plot to seize a military installation and arrest Díaz, leading to her imprisonment until a general amnesty was declared upon Díaz's resignation. Following her release, she was invited to Morelos in late 1911 to join the Liberation Army of the South, also known as the Zapatistas, eventually becoming a colonel in the Zapatista army in 1913. Amidst the coup d'état against Madero and the subsequent rise and fall of Victoriano Huerta, Gutiérrez was imprisoned multiple times for her involvement with the Zapatista movement. She also founded the newspapers La Reforma (transl. 'Reform'), El Desmonte (transl. 'The Leveling'), and Alba (transl. 'Dawn').

After the revolution, Gutiérrez helped to organize several women's organizations and became a maestra rural (transl. 'rural teacher') in the states of Jalisco and Zacatecas, advocating for Indigenous populations there. She died of cirrhosis and an ovarian cyst in 1942, at the age of 67. Her writings have been noted for their confrontational pleito rhetoric, and historical interpretations of her life discuss the influence of liberal and anarchist ideologies on her actions, as well as her impact on women's participation in Mexican public discourse.

== Early life ==
María Juana Francisca Gutiérrez Chávez was born on 27 January 1875 in San Juan del Río, Durango, Mexico. Her father, Santiago Gutiérrez Lomelí, was a day laborer skilled in various professions who migrated north before settling in Durango. Historian Flor Vanessa Rubio speculates that he may have been a Protestant, as many northbound migrants were attracted to Protestantism and other "dissident congregations" such as Freemasonry. Her mother, Porfiria Chávez, was of Indigenous Caxcan ancestry, with family hailing from Juchipila, Zacatecas.

Gutiérrez was educated at a school on the hacienda where her father worked. According to historian Susie Porter, her mother and father were initially reluctant to allow her to attend, but were convinced by the hacienda owner, Don Felipe. Historian Beatriz Elena Valles Salas also theorizes that her father's Protestant faith may have encouraged him to support her education. In 1888 or 1889, the couple moved to the city of Durango to work on the estate of the wealthy López Negrete family. Gutiérrez worked as a maid during this time.

Gutiérrez married Cirilo Mendoza, an illiterate coal miner, at the age of 17 in 1892. Later, the couple moved to Sierra Mojada, Coahuila. There, Mendoza worked as a mineral scraper in the La Esmeralda mine, while Gutiérrez sewed clothes for the mine laborers, maintained a herd of goats, and bought shares in the mine to supplement the family's income. Gutiérrez and Mendoza had three children: Santiago, who died as an infant, Julia, and Laura. According to some sources, Mendoza died from alcohol poisoning while the couple resided in Sierra Mojada, though the actual date remains unclear. (Note: While various sources, including Villaneda, Porter, and Devereaux Ramírez, indicate that Mendoza died some time in the late 19th century, before Gutiérrez became a journalist, Rubio claims that his obituary was published in Vésper in 1909, indicating that he actually died then.)

== Early activism ==
=== Writing and imprisonment ===
While living in Sierra Mojada, Gutiérrez began working as a journalist, writing for the newspapers El Diario del Hogar (transl. 'The Home Journal'), El Hijo del Ahuizote (transl. 'The Son of the Ahuizotl'), and Chinaco, (Note: Chinacos were liberal guerilla forces that fought during the Reform War and the Second French intervention in Mexico.) which all opposed the dictatorship of President Porfirio Díaz. Díaz's regime, which lasted for over three decades, was marked by industrialization and modernization, as well as economic inequality, intensified policing, increased government surveillance, and an enlarged prison system. In 1897, Gutiérrez wrote an article titled "Abusos en la Esmeralda" (transl. 'Abuses in La Esmeralda'), which detailed the treatment of workers at the mine. Because of this report, she was imprisoned for a year in the town of Minas Nuevas.

Gutiérrez's imprisonment increased her antipathy toward the Díaz regime. Between 1898 and 1901, she began to affiliate with various liberal groups. She joined the anti-Díaz Benito Juárez Liberal Club in 1898. (Note: Named for President Benito Juárez, who was a leading figure in the liberal reform movement in Mexico during the mid-19th century. According to Valles Salas, Gutiérrez also founded the club.) Between 1900 and 1902, she also joined the Ponciano Arriaga Liberal Club, the Ignacio Zaragoza Liberal Club, (Note: These clubs were named for Ponciano Arriaga and Ignacio Zaragoza respectively. Arriaga was a prominent liberal reformer, and Zaragoza was a general who led the Mexican Army to victory at the Battle of Puebla during the Second French intervention in Mexico.) and the Mexican Liberal Party. She associated regularly with liberal political figures such as Antonio Díaz Soto y Gama, Librado Rivera, Dolores Jiménez y Muro, and the brothers Enrique, Jesús, and Ricardo Flores Magón.

In 1901, Gutiérrez moved to the city of Guanajuato and began publishing the periodical Vésper (transl. 'Evening Star') in collaboration with Elisa Acuña. The periodical's motto was "Justicia y libertad" (transl. 'Justice and liberty'). Vésper was financed partially by the Ponciano Arriaga Liberal Club and, according to Gutiérrez, partially by the sale of her goats. In addition to criticizing the clergy and the Díaz regime in Vésper, Gutiérrez also published a Spanish-language translation of Peter Kropotkin's The Conquest of Bread. Gutiérrez's criticism of the Guanajuato clergy in Vésper led the local archbishop to seize her printing press in 1901. Subsequently, in 1902, she fled to Mexico City.

=== Second imprisonment and exile ===
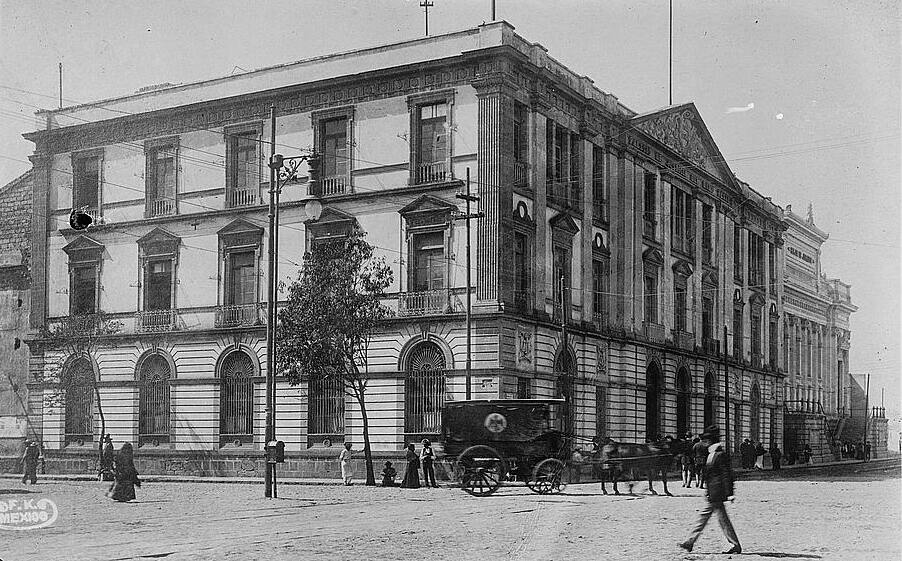
Belem Prison, where Gutiérrez was held multiple times, c. 1910

Gutiérrez was imprisoned again in 1903 due to pieces critical of the Díaz regime published in Vésper. She was sent to Belem Prison in Mexico City, a men's facility generally used to confine prisoners before their trials, where she continued to write for Vésper. In exchange for her release, she was exiled to Laredo, Texas, in 1904 with Acuña. She stayed with journalist Sara Estela Ramírez and joined an existing community of exiled dissidents in Laredo, including Ricardo Flores Magón.

While in Laredo, Gutiérrez continued to advocate for the rights of mine laborers and wrote for Flores Magón's newspaper, Regeneración (transl. 'Regeneration), as well as Vésper and La Protesta Nacional. She also came into conflict with Flores Magón, who accused her of being in a same-sex relationship with Acuña, characterizing their relationship as "putrid lesbianism". Porter argues that this accusation was meant to publicly discredit Gutiérrez and Acuña, exploiting contemporary Mexican attitudes towards sexuality to portray their politics as "perverted". Meanwhile, Gutiérrez criticized Flores Magón and his brothers for charging admission for their rallies and for their inflexible approach to socialist ideology, which she considered too Americanized and poorly suited to organizing in Mexico. As a result of this conflict, she returned to Mexico in 1905.

=== Support for Madero ===
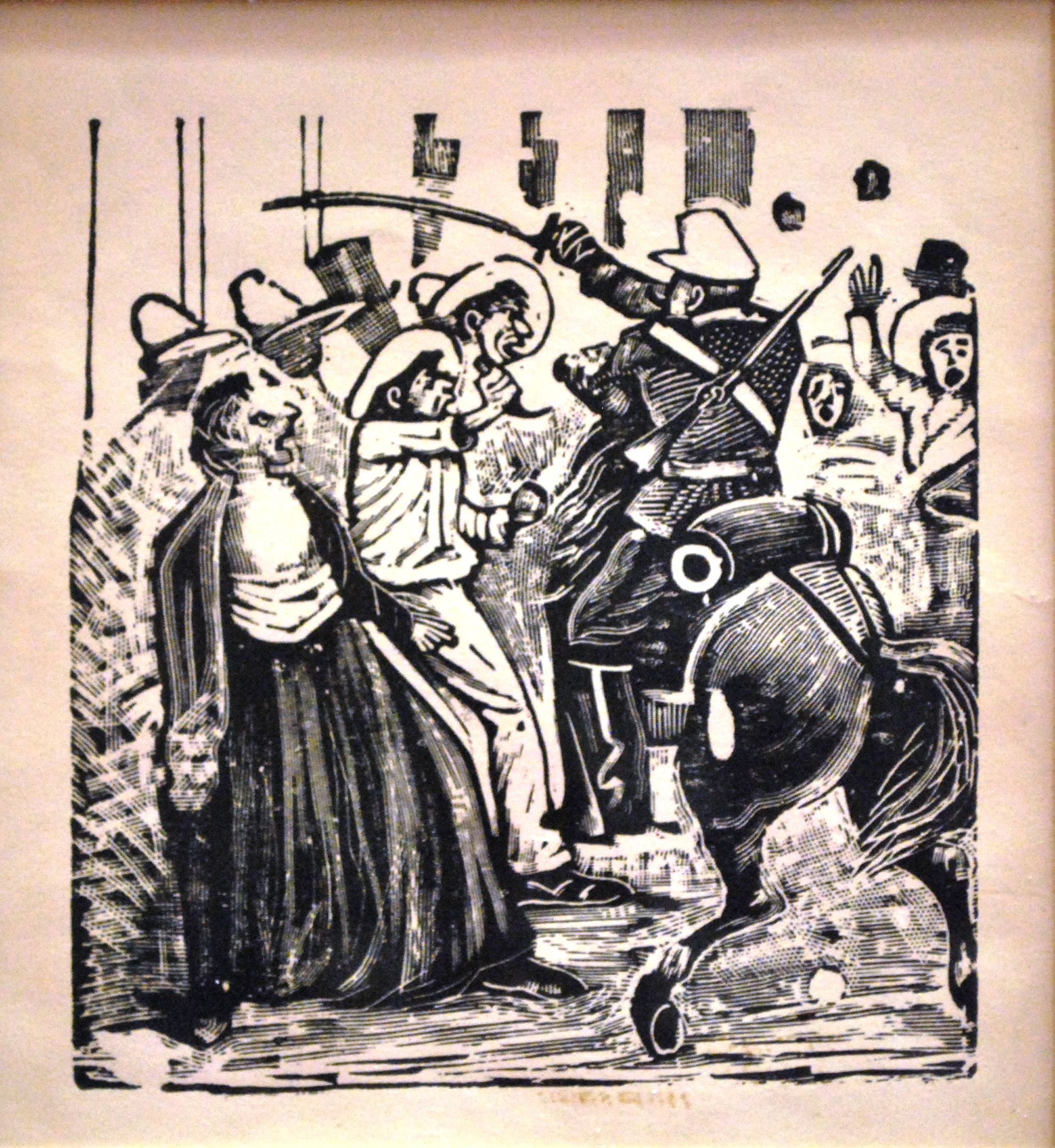
"Manifestación antireeleccionista", a political cartoon by José Guadalupe Posada portraying conflict around Francisco I. Madero's antireelectionists, whom Gutiérrez supported

After returning, Gutiérrez continued writing for Vésper. She also wrote for the newspaper La Corregidora, published by Sara Estela Ramírez; helped establish a newspaper titled El Partido Socialista (transl. 'The Socialist Party'); and collaborated with Dolores Jiménez y Muro and others to form a union federation called Socialismo Mexicano (transl. 'Mexican Socialism'). (Note: Various sources call this federation by other names. According to Valles Salas, it was Sindicalismo Mexicano (transl. 'Mexican Syndicalism'). According to Rubio, it was called the Organización de Socialistas Mexicanos (transl. 'Organization of Mexican Socialists').) In 1907, she published an interview with Francisco I. Madero in El Partido Socialista. At the time, Madero was deeply involved in organizing opposition to the Díaz regime, including by publishing political newspapers such as El Demócrata (transl. 'The Democrat') and the satirical El Mosco (transl. 'The Mosquito'), funding other opposition papers, participating in anti-Díaz protests, and creating a liberal junta to oppose Díaz in 1905. Because of this interview, Gutiérrez was once again temporarily detained in Belem Prison.

In 1909, Gutiérrez helped to found the Club Político Femenil Amigas del Pueblo (transl. 'Friends of the People Women's Political Club') and the Club Hijas de Cuauhtémoc (transl. Daughters of Cuauhtémoc Club). These groups sought to enhance women's political representation, advocating for the importance of women in Mexican society. She also continued to work with Madero, who was selected as the Partido Nacional Antirreeleccionista's (transl. 'National Antireelectionist Party') candidate for president in April 1910. The Antireelectionists opposed Díaz's bid for a seventh term as president. They also advocated for civil rights guarantees and the expansion of public schooling. Gutiérrez organized workers on Madero's behalf and wrote in support of his campaign in Vésper:

We support Señor Madero's candidacy until the victory replaces the efforts, until the victory hymn replaces the calls to war.

== Mexican Revolution ==
=== End of the Díaz regime ===
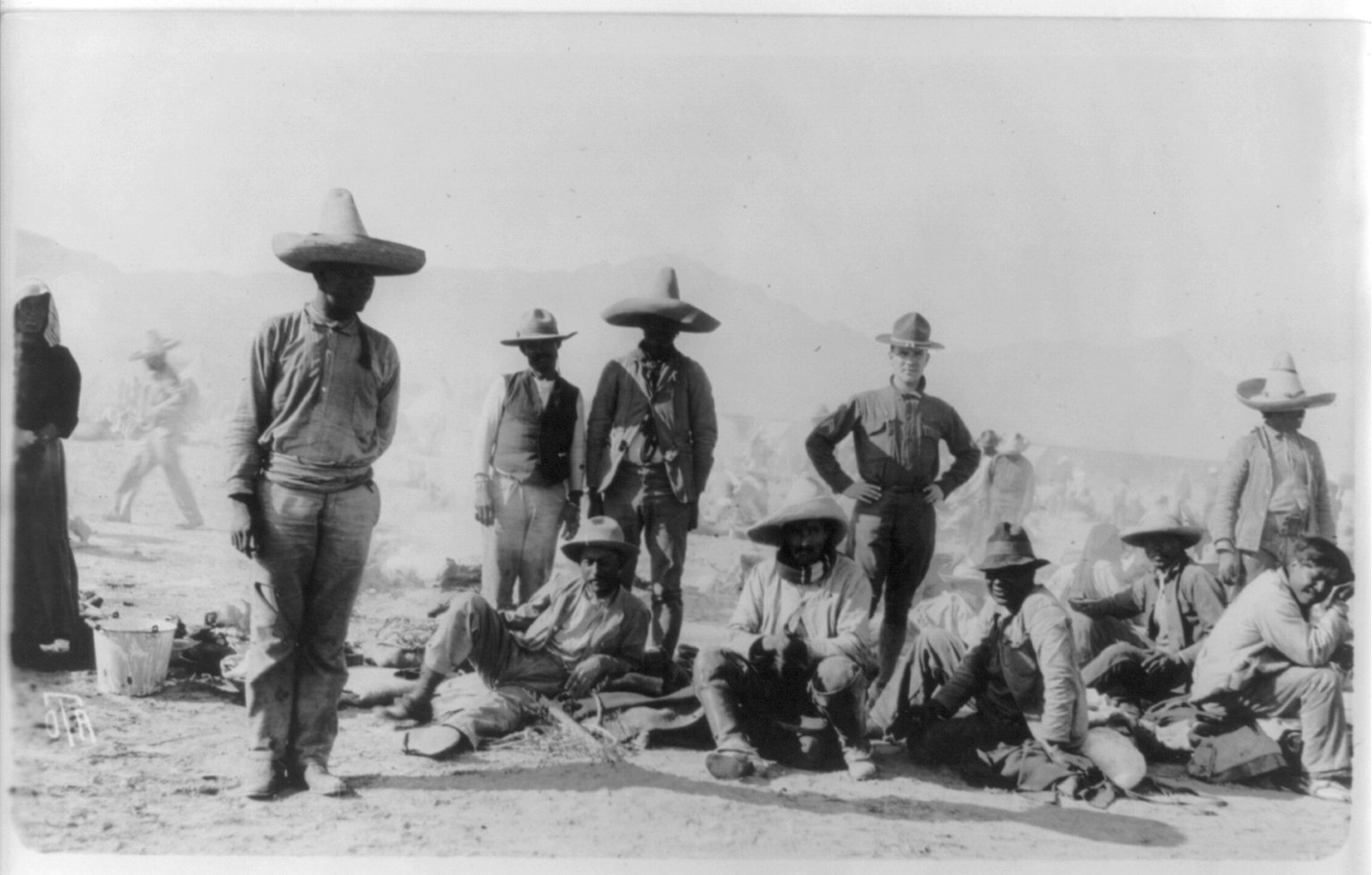
Mexican revolutionary soldiers, 1911. Gutiérrez was a significant figure in the Mexican Revolution.

Madero was arrested on 15 June 1910, allegedly for harboring a fugitive. While imprisoned, he called for the beginning of an armed rebellion against the Díaz regime to begin on 20 November. Fighting began on the appointed day in the state of Chihuahua, marking the beginning of the Mexican Revolution. By early 1911, rebel forces had captured much of the state's countryside. On 16 March 1911, the Díaz government suspended individual liberties.

Gutiérrez, along with several others, conspired to seize control of a military installation in Tacubaya and arrest Díaz. The group's plan called for recognition of Madero as provisional president, free voting, the federalization of education, increased wages for male and female laborers, protections for Indigenous people, redistribution of property seized by the Díaz regime, and the reorganization of municipalities. The plot was discovered on 27 March, and its leaders, including Gutiérrez, were arrested and jailed in Belem Prison. (Note: Some sources, including Villaneda and Devereaux Ramírez, claim that this occurred in 1910. However, most other sources, including Jaiven, Sánchez Amaro, Valles Salas, and Rocha Islas, claim it took place in 1911.)

Despite this setback, rebel forces took Ciudad Juárez in the First Battle of Ciudad Juárez in May. Soon after, Díaz and his vice president, Ramón Corral, resigned, and elections were called for October. Francisco León de la Barra, who was made interim president, declared a general amnesty for crimes related to the rebellion, resulting in Gutiérrez's release. Elections were held on schedule, with Madero securing a decisive majority. He ascended to the presidency in November.

=== Zapatista rebellion ===
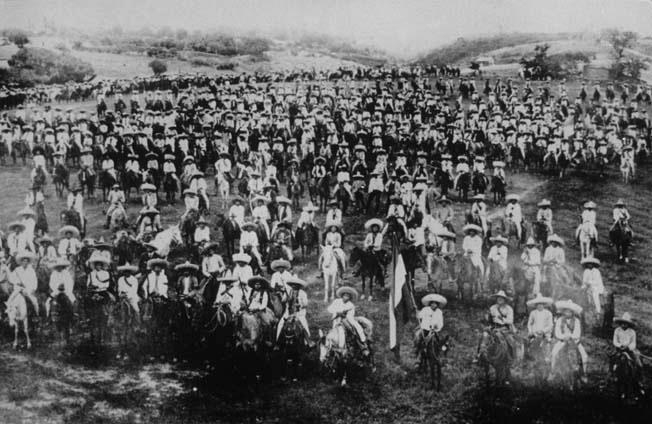
Forces of the Liberation Army of the South (Zapatistas) in Morelos. Gutiérrez eventually became a colonel in the Zapatista army.

In late October 1911, at the invitation of her friends, Gutiérrez and her children traveled to Cuautla, Morelos, to assist the Liberation Army of the South, commonly referred to as the Zapatistas. The Zapatistas, organized by Emiliano Zapata, called for the redistribution of land and wealth to the poor. After Madero's victory, the Zapatistas refused to disarm, frustrated with his unwillingness to prioritize land reform. According to Valles Salas, Gutiérrez's decision to join the Zapatistas was motivated by a desire to reclaim her Indigenous heritage amidst the ongoing exploitation of Indigenous people in Morelos. Under the Díaz regime, Indigenous lands across Mexico, once community-controlled, were transferred to haciendas, leaving many Indigenous people trapped in a form of debt bondage. While the role of Indigenous people in the Zapatista army of this time is debated, many mestizo peasants in central Mexico identified as indigenous, Zapata maintained communication with Indigenous groups, and there is some evidence of direct Indigenous representation in the Zapatista army.

While in Morelos, Gutiérrez was tasked with dismantling groups that supported Victoriano Huerta, an officer in the Federal Army who had supported Díaz. She also took up the cause of Santiago Orozco. Orozco was slated for execution, allegedly for inciting locals to support the Zapatista rebellion. Gutiérrez filed an injunction against Orozco's execution and wrote to Madero asking for clemency. In the end, Orozco was not executed. At some point, she adopted Orozco as her son, and, in 1914, he married her daughter Laura. She also adopted two Zapatista orphans, Herón and Feliciano Pérez Negrete. In 1912, because of her support for the Zapatistas, Gutiérrez was once again detained in Belem Prison, this time for a month. After being released, she rejoined the Zapatistas and was appointed colonel of a Zapatista regiment in 1913.

On 9 February 1913, Félix Díaz, nephew of Porfirio, joined with General Bernardo Reyes to launch a coup d'état against the Madero government, marking the start of the Decena Trágica or "Ten Tragic Days". Huerta supported the coup, successfully arresting Madero and assuming the presidency himself. Madero was subsequently killed while being transported to prison. In 1913 or 1914, (Note: Some sources, including Villaneda, Jaiven, and Rubio, claim that this occurred in 1913, while Devereaux Ramírez claims it occurred in 1914.) Gutiérrez was arrested once again due to her involvement with the Zapatistas. She was held for 10 months in Belem Prison, where she was interrogated by authorities who believed her to have valuable information about the Zapatista movement. Huerta's forces were defeated by a coalition including Zapatistas, Carrancistas, Obregonistas, Villistas, and United States Marines in July 1914. However, the coalition collapsed later that year, leading to renewed fighting between the Constitutionists, represented by Álvaro Obregón and Venustiano Carranza, and the Conventionists, represented by Zapata, Pancho Villa, and Eulalio Gutiérrez. Meanwhile, Juana founded a new periodical in 1914: La Reforma (transl. 'Reform'), which advocated for Indigenous Mexicans. After Villa's forces were defeated at the Battle of Celaya, Carranza assumed the presidency in August 1915. Orozco, Juana's adopted son, died in February 1916. That same year, she was imprisoned again for 10 months, this time alongside her daughter Laura.

Carrancistas assassinated Zapata in April 1919. That year, Gutiérrez founded two newspapers: El Desmonte (transl. 'The Leveling') and Alba (transl. 'Dawn'). In an issue of El Desmonte, she reflected on the impact of the revolution:

In my view, the general situation is neither better nor worse than when this movement started at the end of the last Century, in 1900, when for the first time I participated in the mass protests. And what I say regarding the situation I say of the men; I have not seen one better or worse than the rest... There must be no stopping in the middle of the path, lost in the ruins; it is necessary to pass over all this wretchedness and arrive, the victors, at the summit, where we will join all those who are fighting for an ideal.

== Later life ==
Gutiérrez remained politically active after the revolution, helping to organize the Consejo Nacional de Mujeres Mexicanas (transl. 'National Council of Mexican Women'), which advocated for women's rights and provided aid to mine laborers and their families. (Note: Different sources give different dates for the founding of the Consejo Nacional de Mujeres Mexicanas. Rappaport and Oikión Solano claims it was founded in 1919. Meanwhile, Devereaux Ramírez and Valles Salas claim that it was founded in 1922.) In the 1920s, Gutiérrez collaborated with President Adolfo de la Huerta to establish the "Santiago Orozco Experimental Colony" in Temixco, Morelos, the aim of which was to benefit local peasants. She moved to the colony temporarily, but inadequate resources led a suspension of work there, prompting her return to Mexico City. There, she helped organize the group Acción Femenil (transl. 'Female Action') in 1922.

Gutiérrez also became a maestra rural (transl. 'rural teacher') in 1922, in accordance with a plan developed by Secretary of Public Education José Vasconcelos. Vasconcelos called for the education of the country's Indigenous population, and Gutiérrez specifically worked with Caxcan people in the states of Jalisco and Zacatecas, eventually becoming an inspectora de escuelas rurales (transl. 'inspector of rural schools'). (Note: In 1923, according to Devereaux Ramírez, 1925, according to Rubio, or 1926, according to Valles Salas) In Juchipila, she founded the Consejo de los Caxcanes (transl. 'Council of the Caxcanes'), criticizing Mexican society's failure to incorporate indigenous perspectives or recognize the Caxcan people. In 1926 or 1927, (Note: In 1926, according to Valles Salas, or in 1927, according to Rubio.) she temporarily became the director of the Zacatecas Civil Hospital amidst the Cristero War.

In 1933, Gutiérrez's daughter Julia died of pneumonia, prompting Gutiérrez to take in her granddaughter, Susana, also known as "Tochita". Throughout the 1930s, she advocated for women's rights, reviving the Club Político Femenil Amigas del Pueblo and articulating feminist criticisms of the Mexican state and military in publications such as Preliminares de Combate (transl. 'Preliminary Combat'), Camisas de Colores (transl. 'Shirts of Many Colors'), Toque de Atención al Ejército Nacional (transl. 'Warning to the National Army'), and La República Femenina (transl. 'The Feminine Republic') from 1935 to 1936.

In 1937, she became director of the Escuela Industrial Femenina Josefa Ortiz de Domínguez (transl. 'Josefa Ortiz de Domínguez Industrial School for Women') in Morelia, Michoacán. As director, she organized trade workshops for local women, providing training in disciplines such as carpentry, dressmaking, leatherworking, machine embroidery, and photo printing. She also continued to write during this time, producing the newspaper Génesis, a brochure titled Más allá de los muros (transl. 'Beyond the walls'), and a periodical called El Alma Mexicana (transl. 'The Mexican Soul') from 1937 to 1941. However, in 1941, Gutiérrez sold her printing press to pay for her granddaughter's medical bills. On 13 July 1942, Gutiérrez died of cirrhosis and an ovarian cyst in Mexico City at the age of 67.

== Writings ==
Vésper, always proud, will rise up forever against all tyrants and against all tyrannies... Vésper does not have its energy borrowed from the harshness of the word. Vésper does not have its weapons of combat in the arsenals of insults. Vésper does not rise up in front of magnates in order to then submit to idiots. Vésper does not censure the tyrants in order to cajole the masses... Vésper does not separate itself from the press that sells itself to become affiliated with the journalism that gives itself out for hire. Vésper does not ever sacrifice the energy of its perseverance for the satisfaction of people. Vésper is not a will o' the wisp who thoughtlessly follows the first whim that impresses. All this is not due to an excess of pride, but because it is the only way we know how to understand independence.

— Juana Belén Gutiérrez de Mendoza, "Contra todos los tiranos y contra todas las tiranías", published in Vésper, 1910, quoted in Occupying Our Space: The Mestiza Rhetorics of Mexican Women Journalists and Activists, 1875–1942 by Cristina Devereaux Ramírez

Many of Gutiérrez's writings adopt a confrontational and emotionally-charged style, often employing pleito rhetoric to directly address and accuse those in power. The Spanish term pleito can mean "argument" or "lawsuit"; according to academic Cristina Devereaux Ramírez, pleito rhetoric is characterized by an "in-your-face" protest that directly challenges established power structures. According to Devereaux Ramírez, Gutiérrez's writings resemble "the heckling of a politician on the street", reflecting an "oratorical rhythm" influenced by journalist and politician Emilio Castelar that was commonly seen in journalistic writing at that time. Her newspaper, Vésper, was published under her own name, a departure from her previous anonymously-written works.

Gutiérrez's confrontational tone is further exemplified by her portrayal of Díaz in the article "¡Ecce homo!" (transl. 'Behold the man!'), where she characterizes him as a coward afraid of women. She also accused other journalists of cowardice when they moderated their language in response to Díaz's repression. According to academic Pilar Melero, many of Gutiérrez's writings at this time employ "virile language" and traditional gender roles, shaming men for their cowardice and inaction while simultaneously calling for women to "leave their culturally revered position within the home and become politically active". Per Melero, Gutiérrez's writings helped to define the role of women in the impending revolution, articulating the idea of a "violated home" where repression on the part of the government compels women to engage in public life.

Gutiérrez's later writings, particularly in El Desmonte, are critical of the Mexican Revolution's rhetoric, particularly the "empty words" of politicians. According to academic Ana Lau Jaiven, Gutiérrez adopted a "hispanophobic" stance, claiming that Mexico was still a colony of Spain, portraying left-wing ideologies as "anti-Mexican", and criticizing communists in particular for their reliance on the Soviet Union. She also rejected the portrayal of Indigenous history in Mexican culture as "white washed and distorted", advocating instead for Indigenous self-determination. This position is most extensively articulated in her article "¡Por la tierra y por la raza!", in which she calls for the recognition of the Caxcan people and their culture, attempting to reframe the "false histories" that had been recorded about them and advocating for the return of Indigenous festivals in Juchipila.

Gutiérrez's La República Femenina was also influential on subsequent feminist activists, particularly members of the Instituto Revolucionario Femenino (transl. 'Women's Revolutionary Institute'), a faction of the Frente Único Pro Derechos de la Mujer (FUPDM, transl. 'Sole Front for Women's Rights') that included Aurora Reyes Flores and Concha Michel. In La República Femenina, Gutiérrez argues against women's suffrage on the basis that it would not be "an effective means of selection for the successful appointment of public officials", that it would obscure the will of the people, and that it could be exploited as a tool for obstruction or as a partisan weapon wielded by women acting under external control. Instead, Gutiérrez favored the abolition of men's institutions, which she viewed as conservative and patriarchal, and the reorganization of society around values of life and creativity. The Instituto Revolucionario Femenino built on Gutiérrez's work, proposing the creation of a classless society achieved through the elimination of patriarchy and the restoration of a "natural balance" in which the activities of different sexes are organized based on their distinct yet complementary roles.

== Historiography ==
Several historical interpretations have been proposed concerning Gutiérrez's life. For example, historian Walter Raúl Martínez Hernández argues that Gutiérrez's actions were influenced by contemporary liberal and anarchist thought, as well as her relationships with key intellectual figures such as Antonio Díaz Soto y Gama, Camilo Arriaga, and Dolores Jiménez y Muro. Rubio similarly argues that Gutiérrez was heavily influenced by "liberal-anarchist ideology", in addition to the political networks she formed throughout her life. Regarding Gutiérrez's anarchist beliefs, academic Guadalupe Montserrath Galindo Stevenson argues that while Gutiérrez at one point aligned herself with Magonism, defining her or other women's anarchist leanings solely by the "Magonista yardstick" is limiting. She proposes categorizing these women as "anarcomagonistas" (transl. 'anarcho-Magonists'), acknowledging their engagement with anarchist protest while recognizing the varied expressions of their activism and ideas.

Gutiérrez's impact on Mexican women has also been analyzed. According to Devereaux Ramírez, Gutiérrez's rhetoric and actions opened the way for women to participate in public discourse in Mexico, pushing back against traditional gender roles and contributing to the struggle for women's empowerment. Meanwhile, Melero argues that Gutiérrez strategically navigated patriarchal structures by seeking "protection within established gender ideology" to legitimize her political struggle, using this intermediary space to challenge traditions while simultaneously reproducing certain aspects of them. Melero describes this intermediary space as a "heterotopia", a term originally coined by Michel Foucault to refer to a space that simultaneously represents, contests, and inverts the other spaces within a culture. Per Melero, Gutiérrez's presence in heterotopic space allowed her to "to construct herself as a political subject, to infiltrate discourse and create communities, to write, [and] to (re)imagine herself as a historical subject".

== Sources ==
- Bartra, Armando; Armando, Gerardo (2008). "Movimientos indígenas campesinos en México: la lucha por la tierra, la autonomía y la democracia" [Peasant Indigenous Movements in Mexico: the struggle for land, autonomy and democracy]. Recuperando la tierra : el resurgimiento de movimientos rurales en África, Asia y América Latina [Recovering the Land: The Resurgence of Rural Movements in Africa, Asia and Latin America] (PDF) (in Spanish). Buenos Aires: CLACSO. pp. 401–428. ISBN 978-987-1183-85-2.
- Beezley, William H.; MacLachlan, Colin M. (2009). Mexicans in Revolution, 1910-1946: An Introduction. Lincoln: The University of Nebraska Press. ISBN 978-0-8032-2447-6.
- Benjamin, Thomas (2018). "The Life, Myth, and Commemoration of Benito Juárez". Oxford Research Encyclopedia of Latin American History. New York: Oxford University Press. doi:10.1093/acrefore/9780199366439.013.510. ISBN 978-0-19-936643-9.
- Buchenau, Jürgen (2015). "The Mexican Revolution, 1910–1946". Oxford Research Encyclopedia of Latin American History. New York: Oxford University Press. doi:10.1093/acrefore/9780199366439.013.21. ISBN 978-0-19-936643-9.
- Chassen-López, Francie (2006). "Juárez, Benito". In Carrasco, David (ed.). The Oxford Encyclopedia of Mesoamerican Cultures. Oxford University Press.
- Devereaux Ramírez, Cristina (2015). Occupying Our Space: The Mestiza Rhetorics of Mexican Women Journalists and Activists, 1875-1942. Tucson: University of Arizona Press. ISBN 978-0-8165-0203-5.
- Easterling, Stuart (2012). The Mexican Revolution: A Short History 1910-1920. Chicago: Haymarket Books. ISBN 9781608461837.
- Galindo Stevenson, Guadalupe Montserrath (2024). Educación y Revolución en las Ideas de Juana Belén Gutiérrez de Mendoza [Education and Revolution in the Ideas of Juana Belén Gutiérrez de Mendoza] (PDF) (Bachelor's thesis) (in Spanish). Mexico City: National Autonomous University of Mexico.
- Garner, Paul (2018). "Porfirian Politics in Mexico, 1876–1911". Oxford Research Encyclopedia of Latin American History. New York: Oxford University Press. doi:10.1093/acrefore/9780199366439.013.265. ISBN 978-0-19-936643-9.
- Hart, Paul (2018). "Emiliano Zapata and Revolutionary Mexico, 1910–1919". Oxford Research Encyclopedia of Latin American History. New York: Oxford University Press. doi:10.1093/acrefore/9780199366439.013.450. ISBN 978-0-19-936643-9.
- Jaiven, Ana Lau (2005). "La Participación de la Mujeres en la Revolución Mexicana: Juana Belén Gutiérrez de Mendoza (1875–1942)" [Women's Participation in the Mexican Revolution: Juana Belén Gutiérrez de Mendoza (1875–1942)]. Diálogos Revista Electrónica de Historia (in Spanish). 5 (1–2).
- León-Portilla, Miguel (2021). "Zapata ante los indios. La expedición de los manifiestos en náhuatl" [Zapata before the Indians. The issuance of the Nahuatl manifestos]. Los manifiestos en náhuatl de Emiliano Zapata [The Nahuatl manifestos of Emiliano Zapata] (PDF) (in Spanish). Mexico City: Universidad Nacional Autónoma de México, Instituto de Investigaciones Históricas. pp. 41–60. ISBN 978-607-30-5487-4.
- Lucas, Jeffrey Kent (2010). The Rightward Drift of Mexico's Former Revolutionaries: The Case of Antonio Díaz Soto Y Gama. Lewiston: Edwin Mellen Press. ISBN 978-0-7734-3665-7.
- Luna Alvarado, Rosa María; Pérez Ortiz, Alfonzo (2011). "Rescate de la memoria del Palacio Negro y Tullerías: el fondo Cárceles en el Archivo Histórico del Distrito Federal" [Rescuing the memory of the Black Palace and the Tuileries: the Prisons collection at the Historical Archives of the Federal District]. Boletín del Archivo General de la Nación (in Spanish). 7 (10): 99–108.
- Martínez Hernández, Walter Raúl (2020). "Juana Belén Gutiérrez de Mendoza entre la política y polémica" [Juana Belén Gutiérrez de Mendoza between politics and controversy]. eScripta (in Spanish). 2 (3): 68–92. ISSN 2594-2891.
- Moreno, E. Mark (2020). "Mexico's Chinaco Guerrillas During the French Intervention". Oxford Research Encyclopedia of Latin American History. New York: Oxford University Press. doi:10.1093/acrefore/9780199366439.013.904. ISBN 978-0-19-936643-9.
- Overmyer-Velázquez, Mark (2008). "Porfiriato". The Oxford Encyclopedia of the Modern World. Oxford: Oxford University Press.
- Oikión Solano, Verónica (2013). "Estado, mujeres y Revolución: Refugio García, un espíritu rebelde en el Consejo Feminista Mexicano" [State, Women, and Revolution: Refugio García, a rebellious spirit in the Mexican Feminist Council]. Alcores (in Spanish). 13: 123–141. doi:10.69791/rahc.148.
- Melero, Pilar (2015). Mythological Constructs of Mexican Femininity. New York: Palgrave Pivot. doi:10.1057/9781137502957. ISBN 978-1-137-50295-7.
- Porter, Susie (2003). "Juana Belén Gutiérrez de Mendoza (1875–1942): Woman of Words, Woman of Action". In Pilcher, Jeffrey M. (ed.). The Human Tradition in Mexico. Wilmington: SR Books. ISBN 0-8420-2975-3.
- Rappaport, Helen (2001). "Gutiérrez de Mendoza, Juana Belén". Encyclopedia of Women Social Reformers. Vol. 1. Santa Barbara: ABC-CLIO. pp. 282–284.
- Rocha Islas, Martha Eva (2018). "Dolores Jiménez y Muro, ¿firmante del Plan de Ayala?" [Dolores Jiménez y Muro, a signatory of the Ayala Plan?]. In Espejel López, Laura (ed.). El Plan de Ayala: un siglo después [The Ayala Plan: a century later] (in Spanish). Mexico City: Instituto Nacional de Antropología e Historia. pp. 209–224. ISBN 978-607-539-098-7.
- Ross, Stanley R. (2019). Francisco I. Madero: Apostle of Mexican Democracy. New York: Columbia University Press. ISBN 9780231882613.
- Rubio, Flor Vanessa (2020). "Vida y obra de la mexicana Juana Belén Gutiérrez de Mendoza" [Life and work of the Mexican Juana Belén Gutiérrez de Mendoza]. Ciencias Sociales (in Spanish). 79. doi:10.35830/cn.vi79.464 (inactive 28 August 2025).
- Sánchez Amaro, Luis (2014). "El complot de Tacubaya a través del testimonio de Santiago R. de la Vega" [The Tacubaya Plot through the testimony of Santiago R. de la Vega] (in Spanish). Mexico City: Instituto Nacional de Estudios Históricos de las Revoluciones de México.
- Topinka, Robert J. (2010). "Foucault, Borges, Heterotopia: Producing Knowledge in Other Spaces". Foucault Studies. 9: 54–70. doi:10.22439/fs.v0i9.3059.
- Tuñón Pablos, Esperanza (2011). "El Frente Único pro Derechos de la Mujer Durante el Cardenismo" [The Sole Front for Women's Rights During the Cardenista Period]. In Espinosa Damián, Gisela; Jaiven, Ana Lau (eds.). Un fantasma recorre el siglo: Luchas feministas en México 1910-2010 [A ghost haunts the century: feminist struggles in Mexico 1910-2010] (in Spanish). Mexico City: Universidad Autónoma Metropolitana. pp. 95–124. ISBN 978-607-7957-14-0.
- Valles Salas, Beatriz Elena (2015). "Juana Belén Gutiérrez de Mendoza: Estrella de la tarde" [Juana Belén Gutiérrez de Mendoza: Evening star]. Historia de las mujeres en México [Women's history in Mexico] (PDF) (in Spanish). Mexico City: Instituto Nacional de Estudios Históricos de las Revoluciones de México. ISBN 978-607-9419-62-2.
- Villaneda, Alicia (1994). Juana Belén Gutiérrez de Mendoza, 1875–1942: justicia y libertad [Juana Belén Gutiérrez de Mendoza, 1875–1942: justice and liberty] (in Spanish). Mexico City: Documentacion y Estudio de Mujeres. ISBN 978-968-6851-07-6.
