= Dolores Jiménez y Muro =

Mexican teacher and revolutionary (1848–1925)

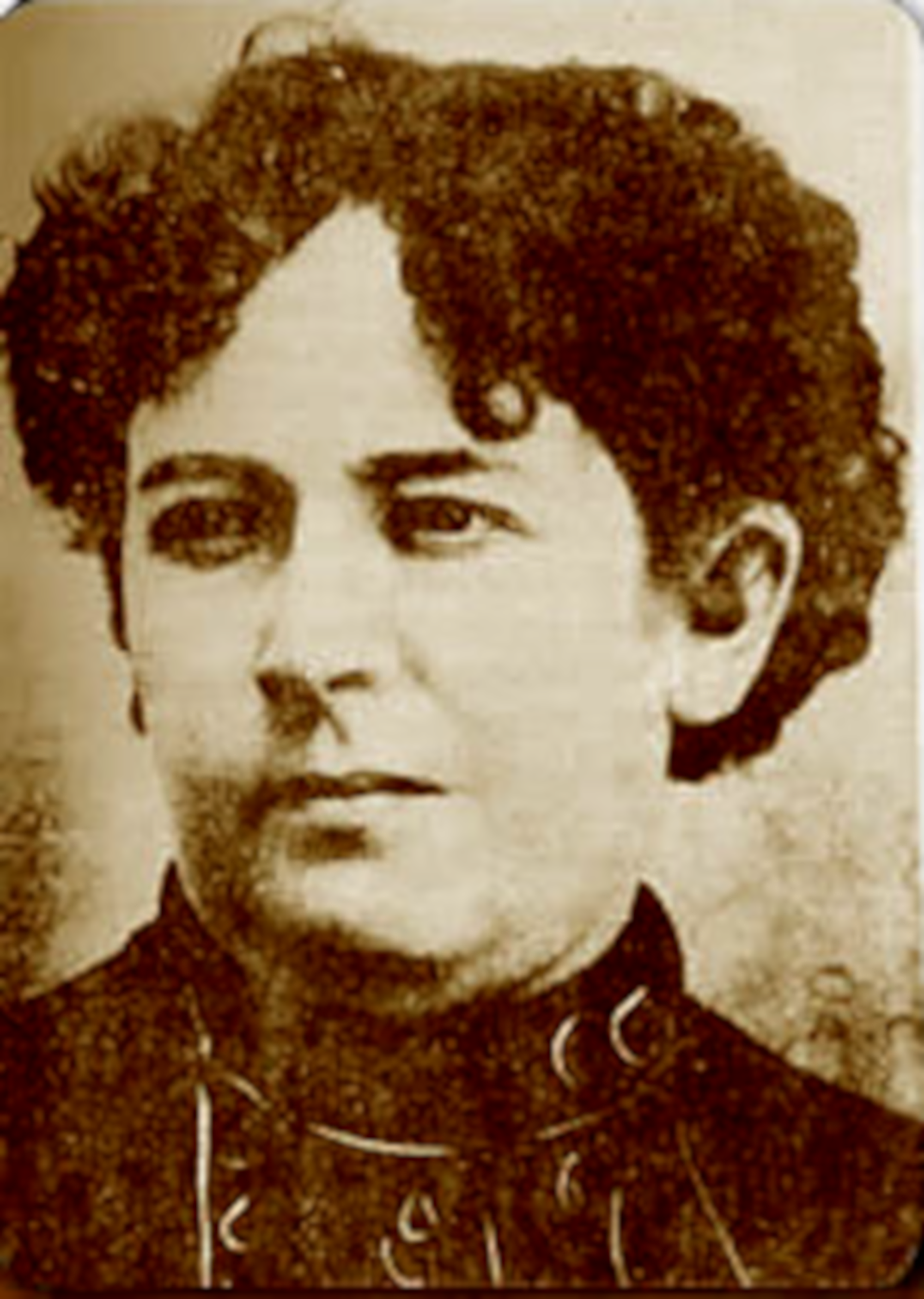
- Jiménez c. 1910
- Born: 7 June 1848; Aguascalientes, Mexico
- Died: 15 October 1925 (aged 77); Mexico City, Mexico
- Other names: Espartaco, Anima
- Occupations: Revolutionary, schoolteacher, poet, military commander
- Known for: Plot of Tacubaya
- Political party: Mexican Liberal Party
- Other political affiliations: Liberation Army of the South

Dolores Jiménez y Muro (7 June 1848 – 15 October 1925) was a Mexican revolutionary, schoolteacher, poet, and military commander. Born in Aguascalientes, Jiménez and her family moved to San Luis Potosí when she was young. She did not receive a formal education but was privately tutored and became well-known for her civic poetry. After Porfirio Díaz became president of Mexico in 1876, establishing a dictatorial regime, Jiménez grew concerned with the plight of Mexico's poor, becoming a schoolteacher and philanthropist. She also began writing for various political journals. In 1904, she moved to Mexico City, where she joined the liberal Ponciano Arriaga Liberal Club (Note: Named for Ponciano Arriaga) and helped found the trade union federation Mexican Socialism. (Note: Various sources call this federation by other names. According to Valles Salas, it was Mexican Syndicalism. According to Rubio, it was called the Organization of Mexican Socialists.)

During the Mexican Revolution, Jiménez participated in the Plot of Tacubaya, a failed conspiracy to arrest Díaz, writing a plan for the conspirators that called for labor and educational reforms, protections for Indigenous people, and a requirement that foreign companies operating in Mexico employ Mexican workers. Later, she joined the Liberation Army of the South led by Emiliano Zapata, also known as the Zapatistas, helping draft the prologue to the Plan of Ayala, which called for the overthrow of the newly elected president, Francisco I. Madero. She served in various positions in the Zapatista army, including as a military commander. (Note: According to Rivera, she was a brigadier general. López Pérez also says she was a general, though she says the position was "honorary" and that she was a "pacifist" who did not participate directly in armed action. Rappaport and Soto claim she was a colonel.) She died in Mexico City.

A political liberal influenced by anarchism and socialism, Jiménez advocated for women's and Indigenous rights. She is considered by researchers to be an important but overlooked figure in the history of the revolution. Her life loosely inspired the novel La maestrita (transl. 'The Little Teacher') by María Luisa Ocampo Heredia, and her name is featured on the walls of the legislative assembly of the San Luis Potosí state congress.

== Early life ==
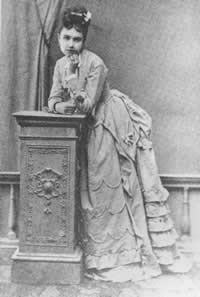
Jiménez c. 1867

Dolores Jiménez y Muro was born in the city of Aguascalientes on 7 June 1848 to Jesús María Jiménez, a liberal lawyer, and Atilana Muro. She was named both for Our Lady of Sorrows and for the city of Dolores Hidalgo, where the Cry of Dolores took place. She had seven siblings. She and her family moved to the city of San Luis Potosí in 1850, where her father worked as a senior government official. As a youth, she was present for several major transformations in Mexican society, including the Reform War from 1858 to 1861 and the Second French intervention in Mexico from 1862 to 1867. The liberal Benito Juárez government briefly moved to San Luis Potosí during the French intervention, and San Luis Potosí was generally known for its liberal atmosphere. Jiménez grew up surrounded by liberal intellectuals.

From a young age, Jiménez was interested in reading and writing, including essays and poems. She had no formal schooling, but her father, who supported women's education, hired tutors to teach her privately at home. Among the topics she studied were English and French. In 1874, the San Luis Potosí state government invited her to recite several poems on civic themes for Mexican Independence Day. These poems were eventually compiled in the collection Un rayo de luz (transl. 'A Ray of Light'). By this time, Jiménez was already a well-known poet, with at least one of her works, a poem praising Ignacio Zaragoza, being published in La Sombra de Zaragoza (transl. 'The Shadow of Zaragoza'), the official state newspaper of San Luis Potosí. She also wrote some lyric poetry, but was unsuccessful as a lyric poet.

== Pre-Revolutionary radicalism ==
In 1876, General Porfirio Díaz led a coup d'état against President Sebastián Lerdo de Tejada, installing himself as president of Mexico. Díaz's regime, the Porfiriato, which lasted for over three decades, was marked by industrialization and modernization, as well as economic inequality, intensified policing, increased government surveillance, and an enlarged prison system. Under the Díaz regime, Jiménez became concerned with Mexico's poor. She began writing for the Revista Potosina (transl. 'Posotina Journal'), and during a trip to Ciudad Tula, Tamaulipas, she wrote a report on the modernization of the haciendas in the region for the journal. She also wrote for La Sombra de Zaragoza and La Esmeralda (transl. 'The Emerald').

In 1883, both of Jiménez's parents died, after which she looked for ways to support herself. She took a job as a schoolteacher and engaged in philanthropic work, which brought her even closer to the country's poor. In 1902, she became director of the Revista Potosina. She also began writing for El Diario del Hogar (transl. 'The Home Journal'), a liberal journal edited by academic and journalist Filomeno Mata. She may have also founded an organization called The Commune, which advocated for women's rights and the right to strike.

Jiménez worked as a rural schoolteacher until 1904, when she moved to Mexico City. There, she joined the Ponciano Arriaga Liberal Club, founded by Camilo Arriaga. The club, which supported liberal and anti-clerical ideas, included several notable women, such as Elisa Acuña and Juana Belén Gutiérrez de Mendoza. During this time, Jiménez also published her writings in periodicals opposing the Díaz regime, including El Diario del Hogar, Chinaco, (Note: Chinacos were liberal guerilla forces that fought during the Reform War and the Second French intervention in Mexico.) El Hijo del Ahuizote (transl. 'The Son of the Ahuizotl'), La Mujer Mexicana (transl. 'The Mexican Woman'), La Voz de Juárez (transl. 'The Voice of Juarez'), and Vésper (transl. 'Evening Star'). Many of her works were published under the pseudonyms Espartaco, which she used for political writing, and Anima, which she used for literary writing. In 1907, she helped found a trade union federation called Mexican Socialism alongside Gutiérrez.

== Mexican Revolution ==
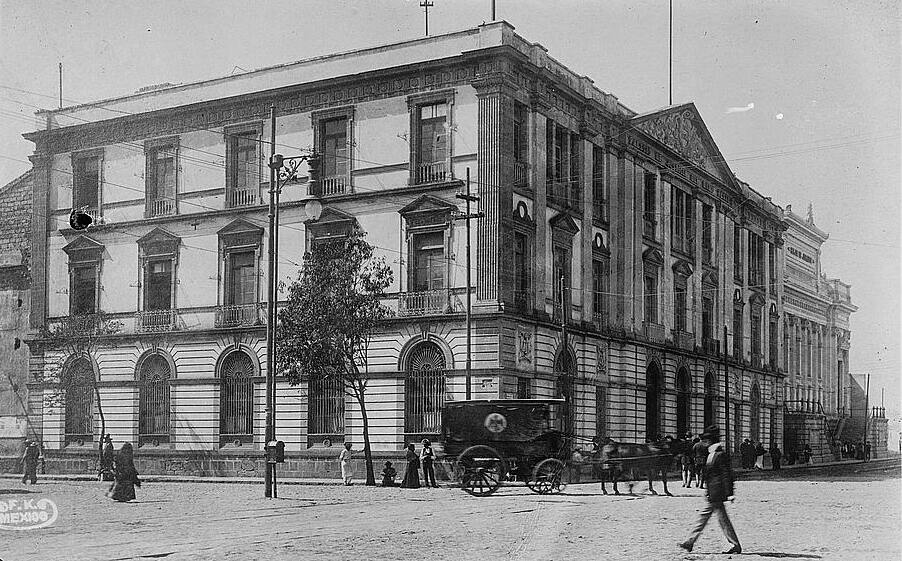
Belem Prison, where Jiménez was held multiple times

Political reformer Francisco I. Madero began inciting opposition to the Díaz regime in 1905. Over the next five years, he funded and published opposition newspapers, participated in anti-Díaz protests, and created a liberal junta to oppose Díaz. He ran against Díaz in the 1910 Mexican general election, but after being imprisoned by the Díaz regime on 15 June 1910, allegedly for hiding a fugitive, was made ineligible for office. Díaz won the ensuing election with, allegedly, 98.98% of the vote. Soon after, Madero called for an armed rebellion against the Díaz regime to begin on 20 November. Fighting began on the appointed day in the state of Chihuahua, marking the beginning of the Mexican Revolution.

That same year, Jiménez assumed leadership of the Daughters of Cuauhtémoc Club, (Note: Named for Cuauhtémoc) which sought to enhance women's political representation, advocating for the importance of women in Mexican society. On 11 September, this group protested in Mexico City against electoral fraud. Because of her participation in this protest, Jiménez was arrested and temporarily jailed in Belem Prison, a men's facility used for pre-trial detention. While imprisoned, she was forbidden from communicating with anyone, including her lawyer. Despite this, she advocated for the release of other detainees and, in 1911, founded the organization Regeneration and Consensus to advocate for the rights of women and Indigenous people.

=== Plot of Tacubaya ===
By early 1911, rebel forces had captured much of the Chihuahuan countryside. Jiménez officially joined the Mexican Liberal Party, serving as an organizer and strategist. On 16 March, the Díaz government suspended individual liberties. That month, Jiménez organized protests in Campeche, Michoacán, Puebla, and Tlaxcala. At the same time, in what became known as the Plot of Tacubaya, Jiménez and several others conspired to seize control of a military installation in Tacubaya and arrest Díaz. Jiménez is credited with writing "The Political and Social Plan", published on 18 March, which outlined the ideas and aims of the conspirators. This plan called for better hours, wages, and conditions for workers, as well as educational reform, protections for Indigenous people, and a requirement that foreign firms operating in Mexico employ Mexican workers.

The plot was ultimately discovered on 27 March, and its leaders, including Jiménez, were arrested and jailed in Belem Prison. (Note: Some sources, including Villaneda and Devereaux Ramírez, say this occurred in 1910. However, most other sources, including Jaiven, Sánchez Amaro, Valles Salas, and Rocha Islas, say it took place in 1911.) At this point, Jiménez was in her sixties and in poor health. Despite this, she staged a hunger strike to demand the conspirators' release. She was eventually released because of this strike. After rebel forces took Ciudad Juárez in the First Battle of Ciudad Juárez, Díaz resigned, and elections were called for October. Francisco León de la Barra, who was made interim president, declared a general amnesty for crimes related to the rebellion, resulting in the release of the remaining Tacubaya conspirators. Elections were held on schedule, with Madero securing a decisive majority. He ascended to the presidency in November.

=== Zapatista rebellion ===
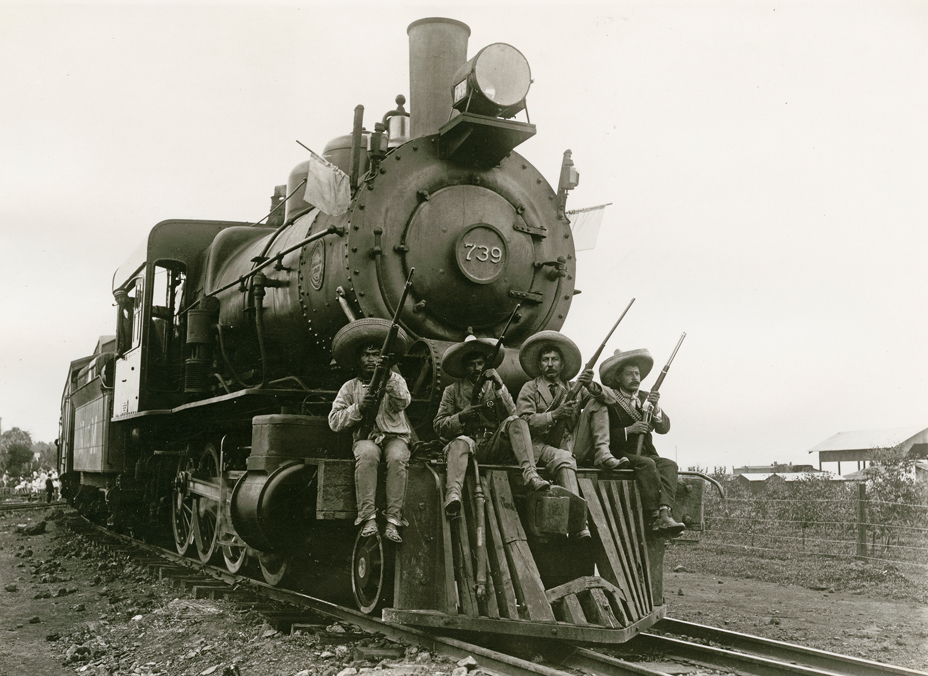
Zapatista soldiers riding on the cowcatcher of a train. Jiménez eventually became a commander in the Zapatista army.

In late 1911, after realizing that Madero would not implement agrarian reforms restoring land to Indigenous Mexicans, Jiménez joined the Liberation Army of the South, also known as the Zapatistas. The Zapatistas, organized by Emiliano Zapata in Morelos, refused to disarm after Madero's victory, promising to redistribute land and wealth to the poor. Jiménez contributed the prologue to the Zapatistas' Plan of Ayala, which called for Madero's overthrow. Later, she worked as a courier, propagandist, teacher, and spy for the Zapatistas. She was eventually made a commander in the Zapatista army. In this position, she engaged in operations supporting weapons transfers. She also opposed the forces of Victoriano Huerta, an officer in the Federal Army who had supported the earlier Díaz dictatorship. In 1913, she became the director of La voz de Juárez.

On 9 February 1913, Félix Díaz, nephew of Porfirio, joined with General Bernardo Reyes to launch a coup d'état against the Madero government, marking the start of the Ten Tragic Days. Huerta supported the coup, during which he arrested Madero and assumed the presidency himself. In response, a coalition including the Zapatistas, the Constitutional Army led by Venustiano Carranza, and the División del Norte led by Pancho Villa, rose up against him. Because of her opposition to Huerta, Jiménez was arrested and jailed once again in Belem Prison. After fifty days, she was transferred to another facility, where she stayed for six months. During this time, she wrote a letter to Aureliano Blanquet, the Secretary of War and Navy, discussing the origins of the revolution and suggesting that Huerta call a convention with the opposition to resolve their political differences. A convention like the one Jiménez proposed eventually took place in Aguascalientes following Huerta's surrender in 1914, after which the revolutionary forces split into two main factions: the Constitutionists, represented by Carranza and Álvaro Obregón, and the Conventionists, represented by Zapata, Villa, and Eulalio Gutiérrez. Following Jiménez's release, she continued to participate in operations with the Zapatista army until Zapata's assassination by Jesús Guajardo in 1919.

== Later life and death ==
After the revolution, Jiménez continued to work as a journalist. Between 1921 and 1925, she also worked as a rural teacher in accordance with the plans of the Secretary of Public Education, José Vasconcelos, who called for the education of the country's Indigenous population. She died in Mexico City on 15 October 1925 at 77. She was buried in the Panteón de Dolores, roughly 2 kilometres (1.2 mi) from The Rotunda of Illustrious Persons.

== Views ==
Researcher Oresta López Pérez identifies Jiménez as a liberal in the tradition of Ponciano Arriaga. However, she also says that Jiménez was open to new ideas, including anarchism and socialism. Additionally, according to historian Martha Eva Rocha Islas, her writing in La Mujer Mexicana reflects an interest in feminism. She published several translations of articles on feminist movements across the world, including those in China and Korea.

In the Plan of Ayala, Jiménez describes history as an evolutionary process. In her view, there are events in history, such as the writing of the Constitution of Mexico, that cause people to act heroically to enact great reforms. She also argues that Indigenous people are a crucial part of Mexico's history but that they are prevented from enjoying their constitutional rights by the large landowners who exploit them. As such, she argues that Zapatismo represents a new step in social evolution, where the working class, particularly the Indigenous working class, is free of poverty.

== Legacy ==
What will be the end of our work,
this beautiful effort of dreaming souls?
The voice of justice says, "Wait!"
but very close to it is the shadow...

— Excerpt from "Fusiones" (transl. 'Fusions') by Dolores Jiménez y Muro

Several researchers, such as López Pérez and Amalia Rivera, identify Jiménez as an important but overlooked figure in the Mexican Revolution. María Luisa Ocampo Heredia's 1968 book La maestrita (transl. 'The Little Teacher') is loosely based on Jiménez's life. The book covers Jiménez's time as a rural teacher in Morelos. At the end of the book, she is shot by partisans under Venustiano Carranza for being "more dangerous than [Zapatista general] Genovevo de la O". The book was set to be adapted into a movie, Tierra y libertad (transl. 'Land and Liberty'), in 1989. In this adaptation, with a screenplay by José Revueltas, Jiménez enters a romantic relationship with Zapata, who says that "a woman like her should be his wife". However, it was never filmed.

In 2011, during celebrations for the centennial of the Mexican Revolution, a debate about the proposed inclusion of Jiménez's name on the walls of the legislative assembly of the San Luis Potosí state congress, where heroes of the Mexican Revolution are honored, took place. While many were unfamiliar with Jiménez and argued that she did not deserve the honor because "she did not participate in the war" and was not born in San Luis Potosí, the proposal ultimately succeeded. Her name was added on 7 June. She was the only woman included on the wall.

== Sources ==
- Beezley, William H.; MacLachlan, Colin M. (2009). Mexicans in Revolution, 1910-1946: An Introduction. Lincoln: The University of Nebraska Press. ISBN 978-0-8032-2447-6.
- Buchenau, Jürgen (2015). "The Mexican Revolution, 1910–1946". Oxford Research Encyclopedia of Latin American History. New York: Oxford University Press. doi:10.1093/acrefore/9780199366439.013.21. ISBN 978-0-19-936643-9.
- Coronado Guel, Luis Edgardo (1990). "Legislación expedida por los Poderes Federales en San Luis Potosí en 1863 y 1867: Fuente para el entendimiento de la guerra de intervención francesa" [Legislation Issued by the Federal Powers in St. Louis Potosí in 1863 and 1867: Source for Understanding the War of French Intervention]. Revista de el Colegio de San Luis (in Spanish). 5 (9): 138–158. ISSN 1665-899X. Archived from the original on May 29, 2025.
- Coronado Guel, Luis Edgardo (2015). "La alameda potosina: historia fragmentada y patrimonio urbano olvidado" [The Alameda Potosina: Fragmented History and Forgotten Urban Heritage]. Diversae. 1 (1).
- Devereaux Ramírez, Cristina (2015). Occupying Our Space: The Mestiza Rhetorics of Mexican Women Journalists and Activists, 1875-1942. Tucson: University of Arizona Press. ISBN 978-0-8165-0203-5.
- "Dolores Jiménez y Muro". Government of Aguascalientes. 2016. Archived from the original on April 23, 2017.
- González Casanova, Pablo (1975). La democracia en México [Democracy in Mexico] (PDF) (in Spanish). Mexico City: Ediciones Era. Archived (PDF) from the original on September 3, 2025.
- Hart, Paul (2018). "Emiliano Zapata and Revolutionary Mexico, 1910–1919". Oxford Research Encyclopedia of Latin American History. New York: Oxford University Press. doi:10.1093/acrefore/9780199366439.013.450. ISBN 978-0-19-936643-9.
- Jaiven, Ana Lau (2005). "La Participación de la Mujeres en la Revolución Mexicana: Juana Belén Gutiérrez de Mendoza (1875–1942)" [Women's Participation in the Mexican Revolution: Juana Belén Gutiérrez de Mendoza (1875–1942)]. Diálogos Revista Electrónica de Historia (in Spanish). 5 (1–2). Archived from the original on March 5, 2024.
- Kapelusz-Poppi, Ana Maria (2008). "La Reforma". In Stearns, Peter N. (ed.). The Oxford Encyclopedia of the Modern World. Oxford University Press.
- Kirkwood, Burton (2010). The History of Mexico. Greenwood. ISBN 978-0-313-36601-7.
- López, Oresta; Hernández, Varinia (2001). "Olvidadas mujeres de la revolución" [Forgotten Women of the Revolution]. La Jornada (in Spanish). Archived from the original on October 18, 2025.
- López, Oresta (2014). "Dolores Jiménez y Muro: Maestra e ideóloga de la Revolución Mexicana" [Dolores Jiménez y Muro: Teacher and Ideologue of the Mexican Revolution]. Poder, fe y pedagogía: historias de maestras mexicanas y belga [Power, Faith and Pedagogy: Stories of Mexican and Belgian Teachers]. Mexico City: Universidad Autónoma Metropolitan. pp. 55–57.
- López Pérez, Oresta (2018). "Dolores Jiménez y Muro: su mano en los planes de Tacubaya y Ayala" [Dolores Jiménez y Muro: Her Hand in the Plans of Tacubaya and Ayala]. In Espejel López, Laura (ed.). El Plan de Ayala: un siglo después [The Ayala Plan: A Century Later] (PDF) (in Spanish). Mexico City: Instituto Nacional de Antropología e Historia. pp. 119–150. ISBN 978-607-539-098-7. Archived (PDF) from the original on March 30, 2025.
- Luna Alvarado, Rosa María; Pérez Ortiz, Alfonzo (2011). "Rescate de la memoria del Palacio Negro y Tullerías: el fondo Cárceles en el Archivo Histórico del Distrito Federal" [Rescuing the Memory of the Black Palace and the Tuileries: The Prisons Collection at the Historical Archives of the Federal District]. Boletín del Archivo General de la Nación (in Spanish). 7 (10): 99–108.
- Mirandé, Alfredo; Enríquez, Evangelina (March 15, 1981). La Chicana: The Mexican-American Woman. Chicago: University of Chicago Press. ISBN 0-226-53159-7.
- Moreno, E. Mark (2020). "Mexico's Chinaco Guerrillas During the French Intervention". Oxford Research Encyclopedia of Latin American History. New York: Oxford University Press. doi:10.1093/acrefore/9780199366439.013.904. ISBN 978-0-19-936643-9.
- Overmyer-Velázquez, Mark (2008). "Porfiriato". In Stearns, Peter N. (ed.). The Oxford Encyclopedia of the Modern World. Oxford: Oxford University Press.
- Pani, Erika (2008). "French Interventions in Mexico". In Stearns, Peter N. (ed.). The Oxford Encyclopedia of the Modern World. Oxford University Press.
- Pérez-Rayón Elizundia, Nora (2001). "La crítica política liberal a fines del siglo XIX. El Diario del Hogar" [Liberal Political Criticism in the Late 19th Century: El Diario del Hogar] (PDF). Instituto de Investigaciones Histórica (in Spanish): 115–142. Archived (PDF) from the original on August 15, 2025.
- Porter, Susie (2003). "Juana Belén Gutiérrez de Mendoza (1875–1942): Woman of Words, Woman of Action". In Pilcher, Jeffrey M. (ed.). The Human Tradition in Mexico. Wilmington: SR Books. ISBN 0-8420-2975-3.
- Rappaport, Helen (2001). "Jiménez y Muro, Dolores". Encyclopedia of Women Social Reformers. Santa Barbara: ABC-CLIO. pp. 340–341. ISBN 1-57607-581-8.
- Rivera, Amalia (2008). "Dolores Jiménez y Muro". Toda Mujer. Archived from the original on April 16, 2015.
- Rocha Islas, Martha Eva (2018). "Dolores Jiménez y Muro, ¿firmante del Plan de Ayala?" [Dolores Jiménez y Muro, A Signatory of the Ayala Plan?]. In Espejel López, Laura (ed.). El Plan de Ayala: un siglo después [The Ayala Plan: A Century Later] (PDF) (in Spanish). Mexico City: Instituto Nacional de Antropología e Historia. pp. 209–224. ISBN 978-607-539-098-7. Archived (PDF) from the original on March 30, 2025.
- Rolls, Albert (July 22, 2011). Emiliano Zapata: A Biography. Santa Barbara: Greenwood. ISBN 978-0-313-38080-8.
- Ross, Stanley R. (2019). Francisco I. Madero: Apostle of Mexican Democracy. New York: Columbia University Press. ISBN 9780231882613.
- Rubio, Flor Vanessa (2020). "Vida y obra de la mexicana Juana Belén Gutiérrez de Mendoza" [Life and Work of the Mexican Juana Belén Gutiérrez de Mendoza]. Ciencias Sociales (in Spanish). 79. doi:10.35830/cn.vi79.464 (inactive August 28, 2025).
- Sánchez Amaro, Luis (2014). "El complot de Tacubaya a través del testimonio de Santiago R. de la Vega" [The Tacubaya Plot Through the Testimony of Santiago R. de la Vega] (in Spanish). Mexico City: Instituto Nacional de Estudios Históricos de las Revoluciones de México.
- Soberanes Fernández, José Luis (2017). "El anticlericalismo en el Congreso Constituyente de 1916-1917" [Anticlericalism in the Constituent Congress of 1916-1917]. Cuestiones Constitucionales. 1 (36). doi:10.22201/iij.24484881e.2017.36.10864. ISSN 2448-4881.
- Soto, Shirlene Ann (1990). Emergence of the Modern Mexican Woman: Her Participation in Revolution and Struggle for Equality, 1910-1940. Denver: Arden Press. ISBN 0-912869-11-9.
- Valles Salas, Beatriz Elena (2015). "Juana Belén Gutiérrez de Mendoza: Estrella de la tarde" [Juana Belén Gutiérrez de Mendoza: Evening Star]. Historia de las mujeres en México [Women's history in Mexico] (PDF) (in Spanish). Mexico City: Instituto Nacional de Estudios Históricos de las Revoluciones de México. ISBN 978-607-9419-62-2. Archived (PDF) from the original on August 28, 2025.
- Villaneda, Alicia (1994). Juana Belén Gutiérrez de Mendoza, 1875–1942: justicia y libertad [Juana Belén Gutiérrez de Mendoza, 1875–1942: Justice and Liberty] (in Spanish). Mexico City: Documentacion y Estudio de Mujeres. ISBN 978-968-6851-07-6.
