= Sara Estela Ramírez =

Mexican journalist and feminist

Sara Estela Ramírez (1881 – August 21, 1910) was a Mexican teacher, journalist, labor organizer, activist, feminist, essayist, and poet, who lived in the U.S. state of Texas. She founded two daily literary periodicals, La Corregidora and Aurora. She has been considered a key member in the support of the Partido Liberal Mexicano, and an early precursor to the modern Chicana feminist movement.

== Biography ==
Ramirez was born in 1881 in Villa de Progreso, Coahuila, Mexico. When she was young her mother died, causing her to have to provide for her father and younger sister. She received her early education in Monterrey before graduating from the teachers' college, Ateneo Fuentes, in Saltillo. She moved to Laredo in 1898 to teach Spanish at Seminario Laredo and remained there until her death.

Ramirez used literature as way to deliver a revolutionary message, criticizing Porfirio Díaz's regime in Mexico, and challenging traditional notions of femininity in Mexican society. Her works were published in La Cronica and El Democrata Fronterizo, as well as daily literary periodicals which she founded, La Corregidora and Aurora. Ramirez as also a playwright with the work, Noema, and published several speeches for the Sociedad de Obreros of Laredo. The themes of her poetry and essays included philosophy, politics, and women's rights.

A member of the PLM, her home was the headquarters of the organization's Texas branch; and she exchanged letters with Ricardo Flores Magón, becoming a known Magonista. She associated with Dolores Jiménez y Muro, Juana Belén Gutiérrez de Mendoza, and Elisa Acuña, and was entitled "La Musa Tejana" by Jovita Idar.

She died in Laredo in 1910 of unknown causes, though records at the time indicate some form of chronic illness.

== Works ==
Ramirez's influence upon Chicana art and literature is noteworthy, despite only 21 of her works, including her essays, surviving in total. Notable examples include:

- Rise Up! (1910): a poetry piece calling upon Mexican women to reject their traditional outlier status within societal decision making, and instead become more proactive and in charge of their own agency.
- El Beso de un Angel or The Kiss of an Angel (1908): An essay upon a woman named "Maria" who embodies Mexico, and whom the poet shows the struggle of the poor of the nation, mirroring her own experiences.

== See also ==
- Hispanic and Latino American women in journalism
