= Elisa Acuña =

Mexican journalist (1887-1946)

Elisa Acuña Rossetti
- Members of the 6th Mexican Cultural Mission (1927). Left to right: Jesús Camacho Arce, Raquel Portugal, Elisa Acuña Rossetti, Samuel Pérez and Albino L. López
- Born: María Elisa Brígida Lucía Acuña Rosete; 8 October 1872; Mineral del Monte, Hidalgo, Mexico
- Died: 12 November 1946 (aged 74); Mexico City, Mexico
- Occupations: Educator, anarchist
- Years active: 1900–1932

Elisa Acuña Rossetti (also Rosete, Rosseti, 1872-1946) was a Mexican anarchist and educator, feminist and journalist, revolutionary and leader of the Mexican Cultural Missions against illiteracy.

== Early life ==
María Elisa Brígida Lucía Acuña Rosetti was born 8 October 1872 in Mineral del Monte, Hidalgo, Mexico to Antonio Acuña and Mauricia Rosete. Though there were several configurations of her name which appear in records, she signed her name as Elisa Acuña Rosseti.

At age 13, she began teaching basic reading, writing, arithmetic, national history, pedagogy and drawing, in the rural schools of the area. She witnessed much poverty and discrimination, which had a profound effect on her development.

== Pre-revolutionary radicalism ==
In 1900, she graduated with teaching credentials and the following year she joined the Liberal Club "Ponciano Arriaga" created by Camilo Arriaga. The club members were ardent supporters of the brothers Ricardo and Enrique Flores Magón, anarchist journalists and founders of the Mexican Liberal Party. The brothers were impressed with Acuña and invited her to serve on the board of directors of the Ponciano Arriaga Club.

In 1901 she participated in the First Congress of Liberal Clubs, held to attack the government of Porfirio Díaz, and helped Juana Belén Gutiérrez de Mendoza establish the newspaper Vésper. Articles appearing in the paper attacked the Catholic Church, defended miners and workers, and criticized the Mexican public, as well as Díaz, for their complacency in accepting dictatorship. In 1903, Acuña, Bélen, and Maria del Refugio Vélez formed the leadership of the Mexican Liberal Club (CLM) and on 23 February signed a "Manifesto to the Nation from the Liberal Club Ponciano Arriaga" written by Camilo Arriaga advocating for more liberal clubs and anti-reelectionist clubs to be established.

Acuña, Arriaga, Belén, the Flores Magon brothers, and Juan Sarabia were arrested in 1903 and locked up in Belén prison and Vésper and other newspapers were confiscated. In prison, she met Dolores Jiménez y Muro and Inés Malváez with whom, along with Belén, she wrote a newspaper called Fiat Lux from the prison. Their imprisonment created protest from their supporters and after three years, they were released and deported. Acuña, Belén and Arriaga fled to San Antonio, Texas to re-establish Vésper with the support of Francisco I. Madero. In cooperation with Sara Estela Ramírez, Acuña, Belén and Jiménez y Muro published feminist articles and promoted the ideology of the Mexican Liberal Party.

In 1907 Acuña, Belén and Jiménez y Muro founded the "Daughters of Anahuac", a group of about three hundred libertarian women, who demanded improved working conditions for women and advocated labor strikes. That same year, she joined the leadership of the Mexican Liberal Party (PLM). In 1908, she founded, with Belén, Jose Edilberto Pinelo and Jiménez y Muro, a worker's organization in Mexico City called "Mexican Socialism." They continued to publish the newspaper Fiat Lux, as the voice of an organization called the Mutual Society for Women. These activities and a failed attempt at rebellion by supporters of Arriaga resulted in the arrest of Acuña, Belén, Jiménez y Muro, and María Dolores Malváes and their imprisonment at San Juan de Ulúa fortress in the Gulf of Mexico.

== Revolutionary radicalism ==
In April 1910 Acuña participated in the organization of the Great Independent National Convention, held in Mexico City to announce the candidacy of Madero as president of Mexico, which brought about the beginning of the Mexican Revolution. That same year she joined in support of the Club Femenil Antirreeleccionista Hijas de Cuauhtémoc (Anti-Reelectionist Women's Club: Daughters of Cuauhtémoc), founded by Jiménez y Muro and others. She also founded the newspaper La Guillotina, part of the radical press. Between 1911 and 1912 she distanced herself from the Flores Magón brothers and supported Arriaga when their ideological split fractured the former alliance. In March 1911 she supported Arriaga's "Complot de Tacubaya" (Tacubaya Conspiracy) to overthrow Porfirio Díaz.

After Francisco León de la Barra assumed the interim presidency, Acuña, Belén and Jiménez Wall, among others, organized the "Friends of the People," and began calling for women's suffrage. They organized a demonstration in June, 1911 in the neighborhood of Santa Julia, but troops suppressed the protest killing nine participants. She was a staunch supporter of Madero, but when he was killed by the coup of Victoriano Huerta she used La Guillotina to expose Huerta's treachery. Along with other members of the radical press, she fled Mexico for a brief time, but returned to join Emiliano Zapata's propaganda team in Puebla. She was soon appointed head of propaganda and began acting as liaison between the followers of Zapata and those of Venustiano Carranza. In 1914, she and Juana Belén Gutiérrez de Mendoza created La Reforma, the first Mexican newspaper promoting the causes of indigenous peoples.

== Post-revolutionary career ==
After the Revolution she worked with the Women's Council and the Pan-American League of Women. From 1920 onward, she was assigned to the Press Department of the National Library, which became the National Newspaper Library of Mexico in 1932. In 1927, Acuña directed the Sixth Cultural Mission ("Crusade Against Illiteracy") of the Secretary of Public Education (SEP). The program installed seven social missions to serve the indigenous communities in the states of Aguascalientes, San Luis Potosí and Zacatecas.

Elisa Acuña died on 12 November 1946 in Mexico City. On 16 November 2010, to mark the Centennial of the Mexican Revolution, her remains were moved from "Civil Pateón of Dolores" in Mexico City, where she had been buried to the "Rotonda de los Hidalguenses Ilustres" at Pachuca in the state of Hidalgo, Mexico.
