= Ana Lau Jaiven =

Mexican feminist, academic and researcher

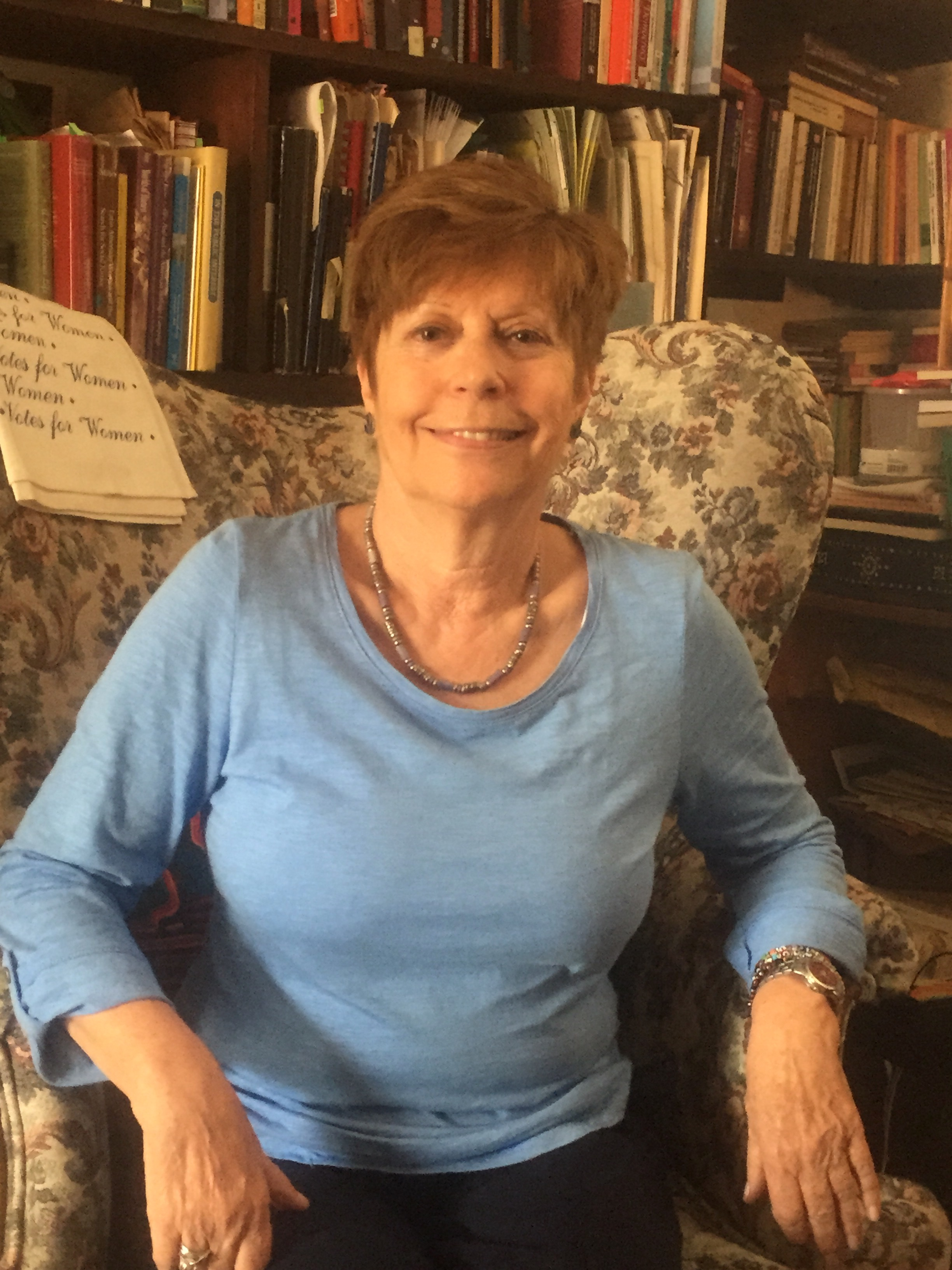
Ana Lau Jaiven in March 2016

Ana Lau Jaiven (born 1948) is a Mexican feminist, academic and researcher at the UAM Azcapotzalco. She began studying Mexican feminist movements in 1980, and has gone on to study women in the Mexican Revolution, and women's movements and groups throughout 20th-century Mexican history. Francesca Gargallo places her in a group of Latin American feminist historians alongside Julia Tuñón, Ana Arroba, Edda Gabiola and Araceli Barbosa.

== Life ==
Ana Lau Jaiven is the daughter of Polish and Russian immigrants. Inspired by the '68 student movement, Ana Lau Jaiven helped form Mexico's first second wave feminist groups in the early 1970s.

In 1983, Jaiven gained a history degree from the College of History at the Faculty of Philosophy and Letters of the National Autonomous University of Mexico. From 1983 to 2000 she was a researcher at the Dr. José María Luis Mora Research Institute, where she participated in projects on Mexican regional history and the history of Mexico City's urban environment. She graduated in women's studies from UAM-Xochimilco in 1991-1992, and gained a Master's Degree in Mexican history from UNAM in 1993.

Since 2001, she has been a research professor in the Department of Politics and Culture of the Division of Social Sciences and Humanities of UAM-Xochimilco. In 2003 she gained her doctorate in history from Universidad Iberoamericana.

From 2003 to 2005 she was coordinator of the specialization and master's degree in women's studies at UAM-Xochimilco. From 2011 to 2013 she was head of the “Women, Identity and Power” Area at UAM-Xochimilco. Since 2017 she has been coordinator of the master's degree in women's studies.

On November 20, 2015, she became the first historian to receive the Clementina Díaz y de Ovando Prize, awarded by the National Institute for Historical Studies of the Mexican Revolution (INEHRM) for her achievements in social, cultural and gender history.

Her lines of research have been gender studies, the history of women in the 19th and 20th centuries, oral history, the history of Mexico in the 19th and 20th centuries, urban history and the history of Mexico City.

== Works ==
- La nueva ola del feminismo en México. México: Editorial Planeta, 1987, 267 pp. ISBN 968-406-088-2.
- (with Carmen Ramos) Mujeres y Revolución. México: INEHRM/INAH, 1993. ISBN 968-805-921-8
- with Eli Bartra and Anna M. Fernández Poncela) Feminismo en México, ayer y hoy. México, D.F.: Universidad Autónoma Metropolitana, 2000.
- (with Eli Bartra, Gloria Careaga y Mary Goldsmith) Estudios feministas en América Latina y el Caribe. Maestría en Estudios de la Mujer, Universidad Autónoma Metropolitana Xochimilco, 2005.
- Cada una desde su trinchera. Cambios favorables en la vida de mujeres y sus comunidades provocados por una intervención efectiva. Programa Convive y Fondo PROEQUIDAD, México, Instituto Nacional de las Mujeres, 2006, 277 pp. ISBN 968-5552-76-2.
- (with Mary Goldsmith and María del Pilar Cruz) Procesos de construcción del género. Cultura, familia, trabajo, política y sexualidad en el México contemporáneo. México: UAM-Xochimilco-Especialización Maestría en Estudios de la Mujer, 2009, 290 pp. ISBN 978-607-00-1017-0.
- (with Mónica Cejas) En la encrucijada de género y ciudadanía. Sujetos políticos, derechos, gobierno, nación y acción política. Conacyt, UAM-X, Itaca, 2011, 323 pp.
- (with Mónica Cejas) Mujeres, y ciudadanía en México: estudios de caso. Conacyt, UAM-X, Itaca, 2011, 311pp. ISBN 978-607-7957-13-3.
- (with Gisela Espinosa Damián) Un fantasma recorre el siglo. Luchas feministas en México, 1910-2010. México: Itaca/Ecosur/UAM-X/Conacyt, 2011, 546pp. (Coordinadora junto con Gisela Espinosa Damián), ISBN 978-607-7957-14-0
- El sufragio femenino en México. Voto en los estados. México: El Colegio de Sonora, 2013. ISBN 978-607-7775-40-9
- (with Elsie Mc Phail Fanger) Rupturas y continuidades. Historia y Biografías de Mujeres. México: UAM-X, 2018. ISBN 978-607-28-1409-7.
- (ed. with Joel Estudillo García and José Edgar Nieto Arizmendi) Diccionario enciclopédico del feminismo y los estudios de género en México. México: CIEG/UNAM, 2019. ISBN 978-607-30-1474-8.
