= María Luisa Ocampo Heredia =

Mexican novelist, playwright, and translator

María Luisa Ocampo Heredia (24 November 1899 – 15 August 1974) was a Mexican novelist, playwright, and translator. Born in Chilpancingo, Guerrero, her parents were Melchor R. Ocampo and Isaura Heredia; there was at least one sibling, the actress, Gloria Iturbe. She studied at the Escuela Superior de Comercio y Administración, the Escuela Nacional Preparatoria, and at the National Autonomous University of Mexico She founded the theatrical group, Los Pirandellos.
