= Julia Tuñón Pablos =

Mexican historian and author (born 1948)

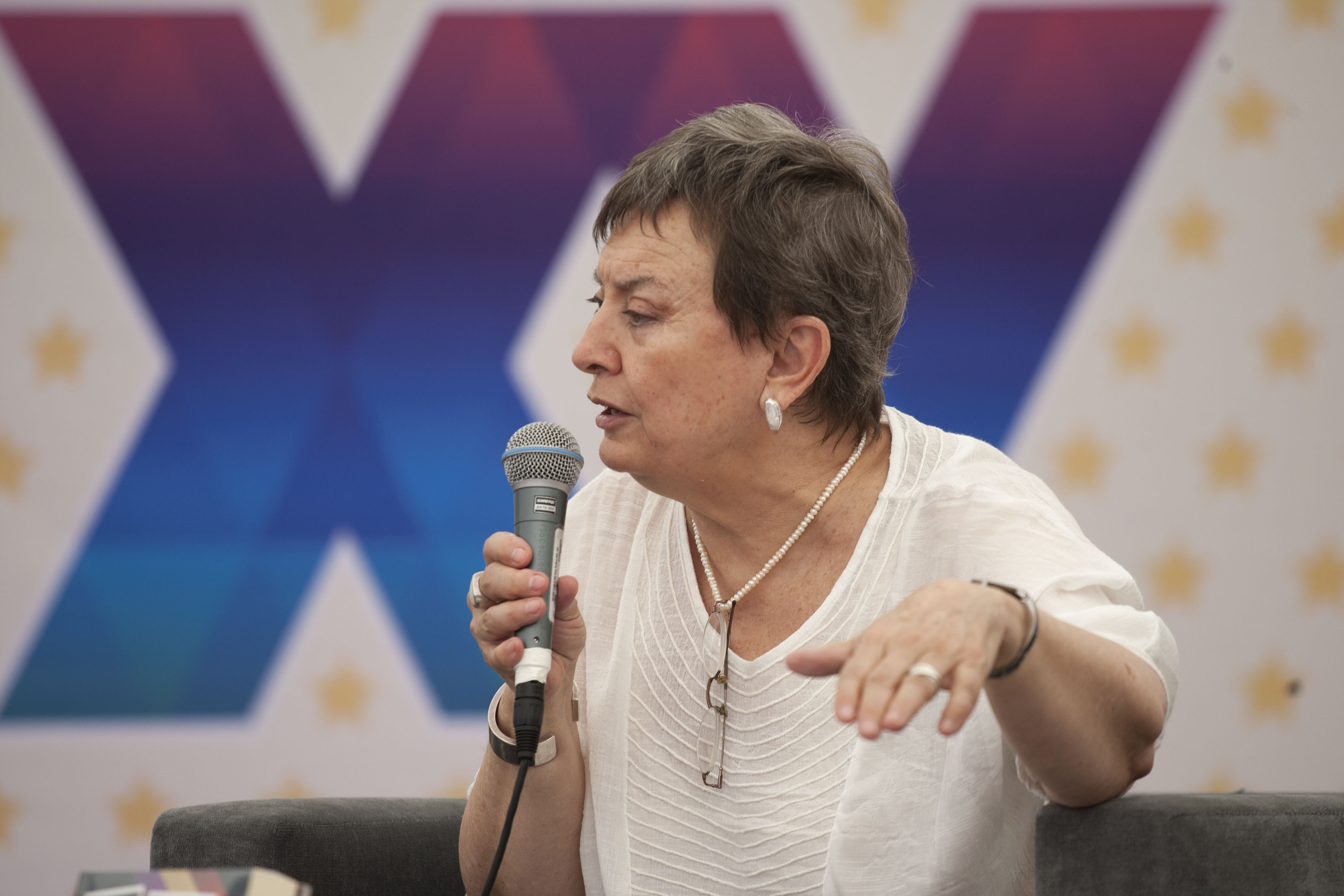
- Born: 1948; Monterrey, Nuevo León, Mexico
- Occupation(s): Historian, author, professor
- Years active: 1982-2015

Julia Tuñón Pablos (born 1948) is a Mexican historian and author. In 1987, she wrote the first comprehensive historical account of women's contributions to building the nation, as prior histories had predominantly left women out of the narrative. In 1983 and again in 2000 she was awarded the Gabino Barreda Medal for academic excellence She won the Susana San Juan Literary Prize in 1998 and was awarded the Emilio García Riera Medal by the University of Guadalajara in 2004.

Preguntarnos por la participación femenina en la historia de México, implica la conciencia de múltiples desconocimientos. (Asking us about participation of females in the history of Mexico, implies the awareness of multiple unknowns.)

— - Julia Tuñón Pablos

== Biography ==
Julia Tuñón was born in 1948 in Monterrey, Nuevo León, Mexico. She completed her basic studies at Luis Vives Institute in Mexico City and in 1969 earned a BA in history from the National Autonomous University of Mexico (UNAM). In 1977 she completed her Master's and in 1987 her PhD in history also at UNAM. For her academic excellence, she was awarded the Gabino Barreda Medal twice. In 1989, Tuñón joined the Sistema Nacional de Investigadores (National System of Researchers).

She was a full-time researcher for both the Dirección de Estudios Históricos (Directorate of Historical Studies) and Instituto Nacional de Antropología e Historia (INAH) (National Institute of Anthropology and History), beginning in 1982 as well as teaching as a visiting professor at El Colegio de México, the Universidad Autónoma Metropolitana, UNAM, and the University of Guadalajara. In 2011 she was appointed as a professor for the academic term at the University of Paris-VIII for literature of the Romance languages including Italian, Portuguese and Spanish. In February, 2015, Tuñón began a collaboration on an Illustrated History of Mexico series with Enrique Florescano and in March, 2015, she retired from INAH.

Predominantly her work has centered on women and the issues that they face. She explores the dichotomy between the idealized image of women in popular culture and women's realities. The journal, Lingua Franca (Volume 11, No. 2—March 2001) called Tuñón's analytical treatment "elegant" and her Mujeres de luz y sombra en el cine mexicano: La construcción de una imagen, 1939-1952 (Women of light and shadow in the Mexican cinema: The construction of an image, 1939-1952) one of the best histories currently being written in Mexico. In particular, she looks at topics like guilt, the role of Christian morality, poverty, gender and power relationships

== Selected works ==
- Historia de un sueño: el Hollywood tapatío, 1986. (in Spanish)
- Mujeres en México: una historia olvidada, 1987. (in Spanish)
- Entrevista con Emilio "El Indio" Fernández, 1988. (in Spanish)
- El siglo XIX (1821-1880), 1991. (in Spanish)
- Mujeres en México: recordando una historia, 1998. (in Spanish)
- Mujeres de luz y sombra en el cine mexicano: la construcción de una imagen - 1939-1952, 1998. (in Spanish)
- Women in Mexico: A Past Unveiled, 1999. (in English)
- Los rostros de un mito: personajes femeninos en las películas de Emilio "Indio" Fernández, 2000. (in Spanish)
- Cuerpo y espíritu. Médicos en celuloide, 2005. (in Spanish)
- Enjaular los cuerpos: normativas decimonónicas y feminidad en México, 2008. (in Spanish)
