= Belem Prison =

Prison in Mexico City

Belem Prison was located in Mexico City, Mexico and operated from 1886 until the early 1930s. The building was originally used by the Church and was confiscated during the Liberal Reform in 1857. The prison was replaced as the main prison by Lecumberri prison, becoming the equivalent of a county or city jail. It housed many well-known criminals who had very public trials.

== Architectural and ecclesiastical heritage ==
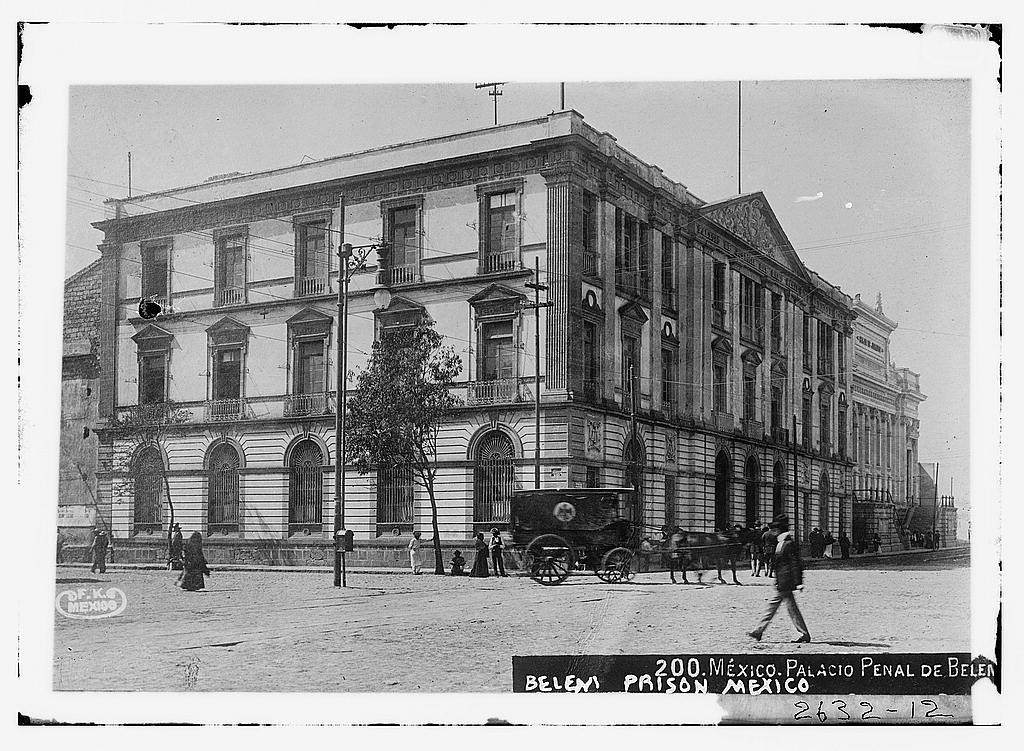

The building that would eventually become Belén Prison was commissioned by Padre Domingo Perez de Barcia. It was built in 1683, and in 1908 was listed as one of the oldest buildings in the city. This well noted priest of the late 17th century collected the funds necessary to build what would be named Colegio de San Miguel de Belém (Translation: College of St. Michael of Bethlehem). This building, commonly referred to as Colegio de las Mochas (Translation: College of the Cropped ones), was over time a convent, an asylum, and a hospital for indigent religious women.

In 1857, during the period known as Liberal reform, the property was confiscated by the state. In 1886, the building re-opened as Belén Prison.

== Prison history ==
In 1886, Belén became the main prison for Mexico City. It was in this year that all prisoner and courts were moved from the municipal palace and took up residence in the former convent. This building was located in the southwest area of Mexico City. The prison was known throughout the city to be a center of filth and crime. Criminals who came in left with a better understanding of how to be a criminal. If someone were innocent when they entered Belén that they would come out a full-fledged criminal.

After 1900 when Lecumberri prison was opened, Belén became more like a county jail, holding only short sentence criminals and those awaiting trial after was opened in 1900.

The building was eventually torn down, making way for a school to be built. Many Prison reformers had urged that Belén was the epitome of a broken prison. They argued that the prison was more of a source of entertainment than a place of rehabilitation.

During the Mexican Revolution, the prison was attacked and many of the prisoners set free.

== Layout ==
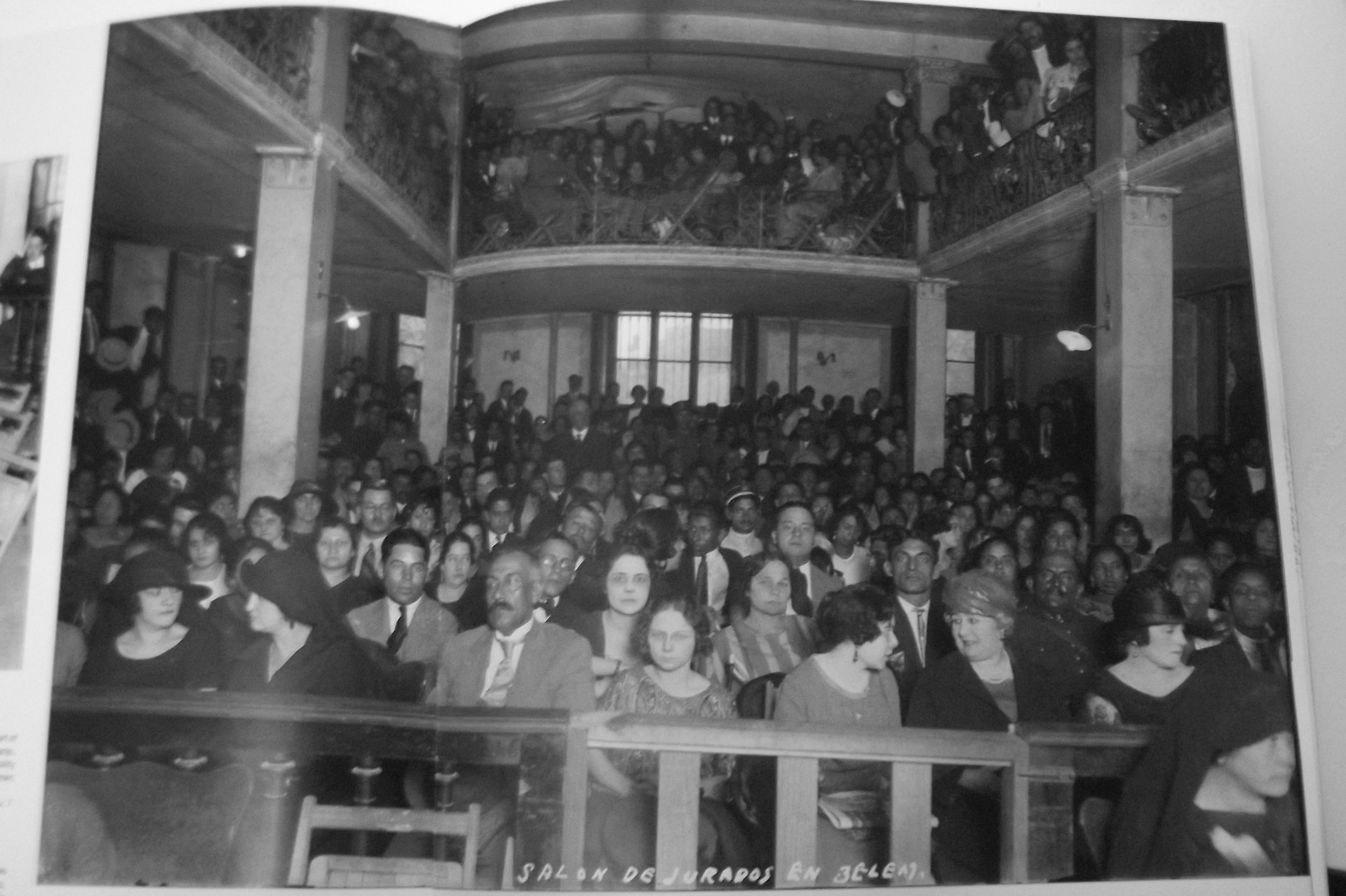
An unspecified trial held in the Court Rooms of Belem

The building had three floors and a basement. The top floor was reserved for elites/nobles of Mexico City. One scholar notes, “once a gentleman, always a gentleman, even in prison”. This area was called the “Department of Distinction” and offered the elite law breakers the same comforts they would find at home.

The second and first floors held areas for the women and children who were sentenced to jail time. While they were afforded separate living accommodations, these separations were not enforced. These floors also held the administrative offices and court rooms.

The basement of Belén was a place that was notorious. In the basement, frequent flooding happened, leaving the inmates to wade through their cells in dangerously contaminated waters. The two most notorious cells in the basement were named “Hell” and “Purgatory” these were solitary confinement cells and no light entered the cells.

The cells had a single hole in the ground for the prisoners to relieve themselves in, which only compounded the problems of flooding, adding a dangerously disgusting aspect.

The cells in the basement where reserved for those who had been sentenced to Life incarceration or the death penalty. If a person who had been sentenced to death did not die from the conditions in the cellar, they would then face a firing squad.

The firing squad would take the inmate to “The Garden” which was a walled in structure on the rear-facing side of the building. The men would place the inmate against the wall and proceed to carry out the death sentence. The use of the death penalty waned at the turn of the century; prisoners no longer feared “The Garden” because it was very likely they could and would get their sentence overturned to a twenty-year sentence.

== Prison Order ==
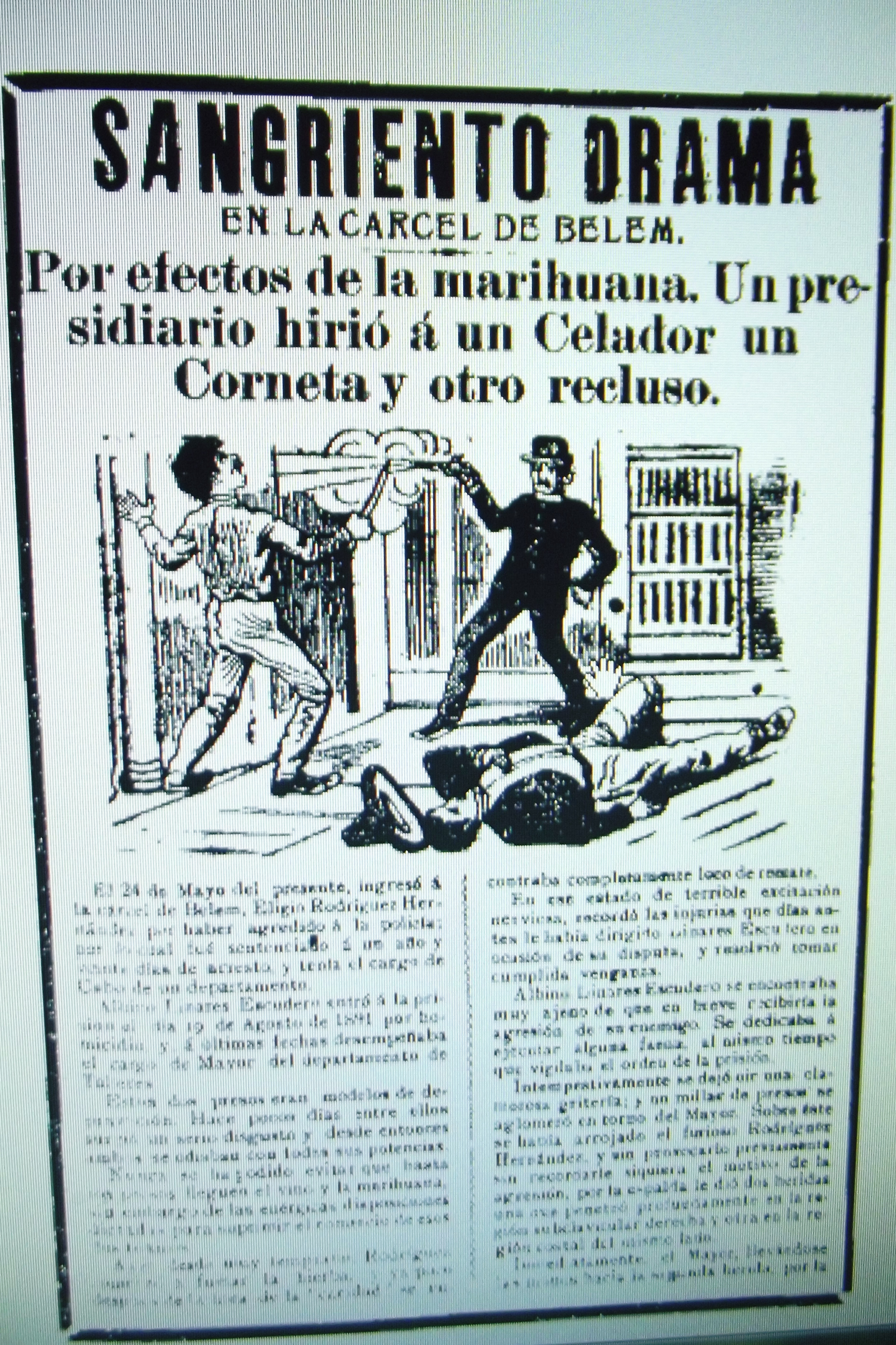
Newsprint depicting trouble in Belem Prison due to marijuana use

The prison had few officials tasked with oversight of the prison. The inmates were in charge of the daily running of the facility. These residents were called “Presidents” and in charge of making sure the functions were carried out. The few staff that oversaw these “Presidents” were termed “Majors” and left even discipline of the inmates to the “President of Blows”.

== Prison culture ==
The inmates at the prison could often be seen sitting on the patio of Belem playing cards. Proponents for prison reform cited Belén as the epitome of poorly run and thought out prison. Many of the convicts would leave with a better understanding of how to perpetrate criminal acts than when they entered. The inmates who were frequent visitors to the prison learned quickly how to manipulate the system.

The inmates were responsible for the creation of slang language that was used in the prison. Common items were renamed by the inmates so that outsiders would not understand what they were talking about. This language system allowed the prisoners to bring in contraband items such as drugs. Marijuana was a common drug that many of the convicts used.

The prison was also "a known hot bed for illicit relations. Like many prisons, the men imprisoned reverted to homosexual relations while incarcerated", relationships ranging from sex partner to servant. In the language of the prison, a gaterowas a person who served as domestics to other prisoners, and mula was the word to describe a homosexual man who flaunted his sexuality to other prisoners.

A series of interviews about homosexuality in the prison were conducted by Carlos Roumagnac between 1903 and 1906. Roumagnac was one of the leading prison reform criminologists at the time in Mexico. Roumagnac considered pederasty to be the worst vice morally and wished to understand the connection between social behavior and sexual inclinations. In his time spent in the prison he found that relationships in the prison quite closely followed that on society. The strong subjugate the weak, and homosexual relations were a continuation of traditional gender roles behind the prison walls.

== Society and Belén ==
Garza's book, The Imagined Underworld, focuses on the break in reality between the ruling elite and the lower class. It focuses on the idea that the ruling elite vilified the poor and their actions without understanding what the outside causes were for illegal actions. Exaggeration was a key part in this view and was carried out through media outlets of the period.

The upper class saw two reasons for crime, alcoholism or marijuana drug use. The demonization of these two substances allowed the elite to have a solid source of illegal activity, something to blame for the actions of poor men and women that did not include the horrible conditions they were forced to bare because of their economic standings.

Marijuana was prevalent in the prison and that many of the public believed that their actions were spurred on by the use of marijuana. An illustration from the local newspaper depicts a violent action by one of the prisoners, explaining in detail that his use of marijuana had led to madness. This common thread can be seen throughout the turn of the nineteenth century in Mexican newspapers and public reactions.

While the prison was seen as a vile place, the public could and would still come and view the prisoners. A common occurrence during the nineteenth century was for those of higher class to come and view executions, tour prisons, and mental asylums. A contemporary tour guide for foreigners indicates that visitors can view the prison and tour its facilities, but warns against it.

== Famous inmates ==
=== María Villa ===
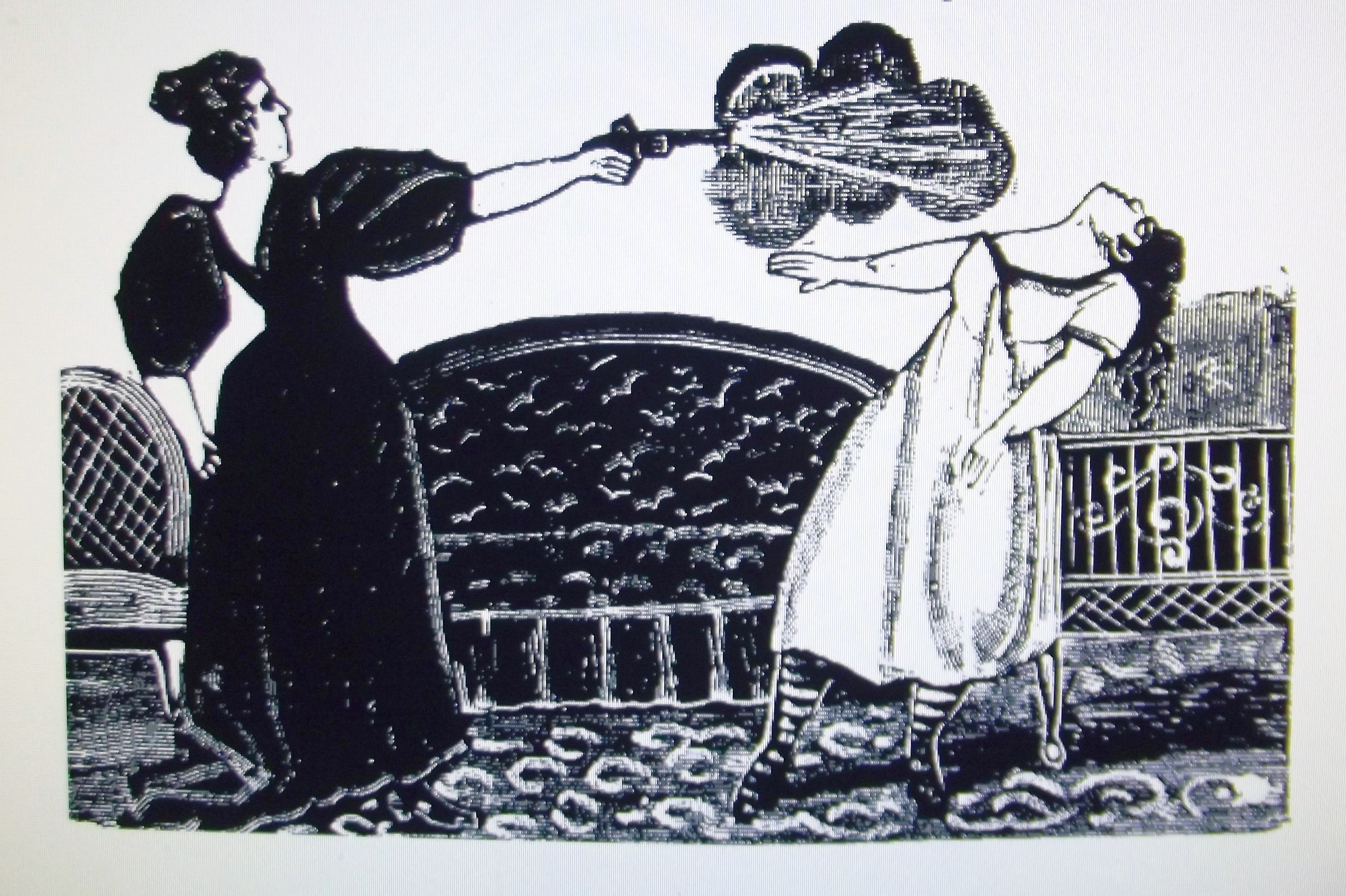
Maria Villa depicted shooting her rival for a lover, which she was sentenced twenty years in Belén Prison

Villa was a prostitute who was sentenced to twenty years in Belém Prison. The story reads like a melodrama. María and another prostitute were lovers of the same man. The other prostitute publicly humiliated Villa and called into question her honor. The two fought many times publicly over the man. The tale ends with Villa killing the other prostitute. This case was controversial and a hot topic because Villa herself had used a gun to restore her honor by killing the other prostitute. In that era, prostitutes were by definition women without honor. Women with honor relied on men to restore their honor when it had been called into question. Villa had broken the social norms of the time and was punished harshly for her crime. Villa attempted to defend herself in court and was unsuccessful at playing the victim card to get out of the murder charges. Her sentence was the harshest given to a woman; judges had never sentenced a woman to death previously, she received twenty years in Belem.

=== Eduardo Velázquez ===
Former Police chief that was a prisoner in Belem, was behind the very controversial death of Arnulfo Arroyo who was beaten to death after an attempt on Diaz’s life. Velazquez is said to have shot himself in the head while incarcerated, but Garza explains that this was a propagated lie and that the Mexican people did not believe it.

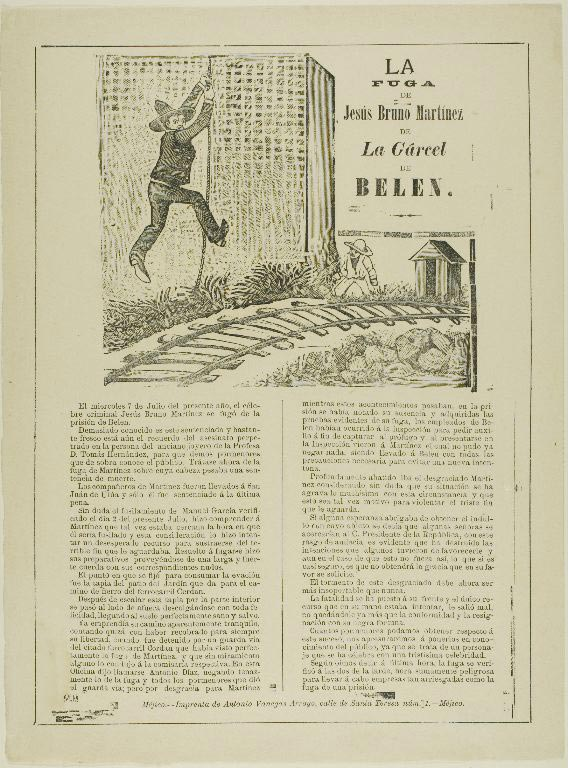
News Print etching of Jesús Bruno Martínez who escaped from Belén Prison

=== Jesús Bruno Martínez ===
Inmate who broke out of Belem Prison. Also helped other inmates learn how to manipulate the system and write letters to judges and the President to receive release from the jail.

== Infectious disease and Belén ==
The living conditions of Belén were notorious for enabling the spread of infectious diseases. Many of the outbreaks consisted of typhus. Belén was the reason for many communications between Mexico and the U.S. during its time of operation due to its prevalence of infectious diseases.

Over population and overall filthy conditions of the prison were the number one source of the spread of diseases such a typhus and influenza. The other issue is that the people who were incarcerated usually came from the lower classes, whose daily living conditions were not much better.
