= Military history of Mexico =

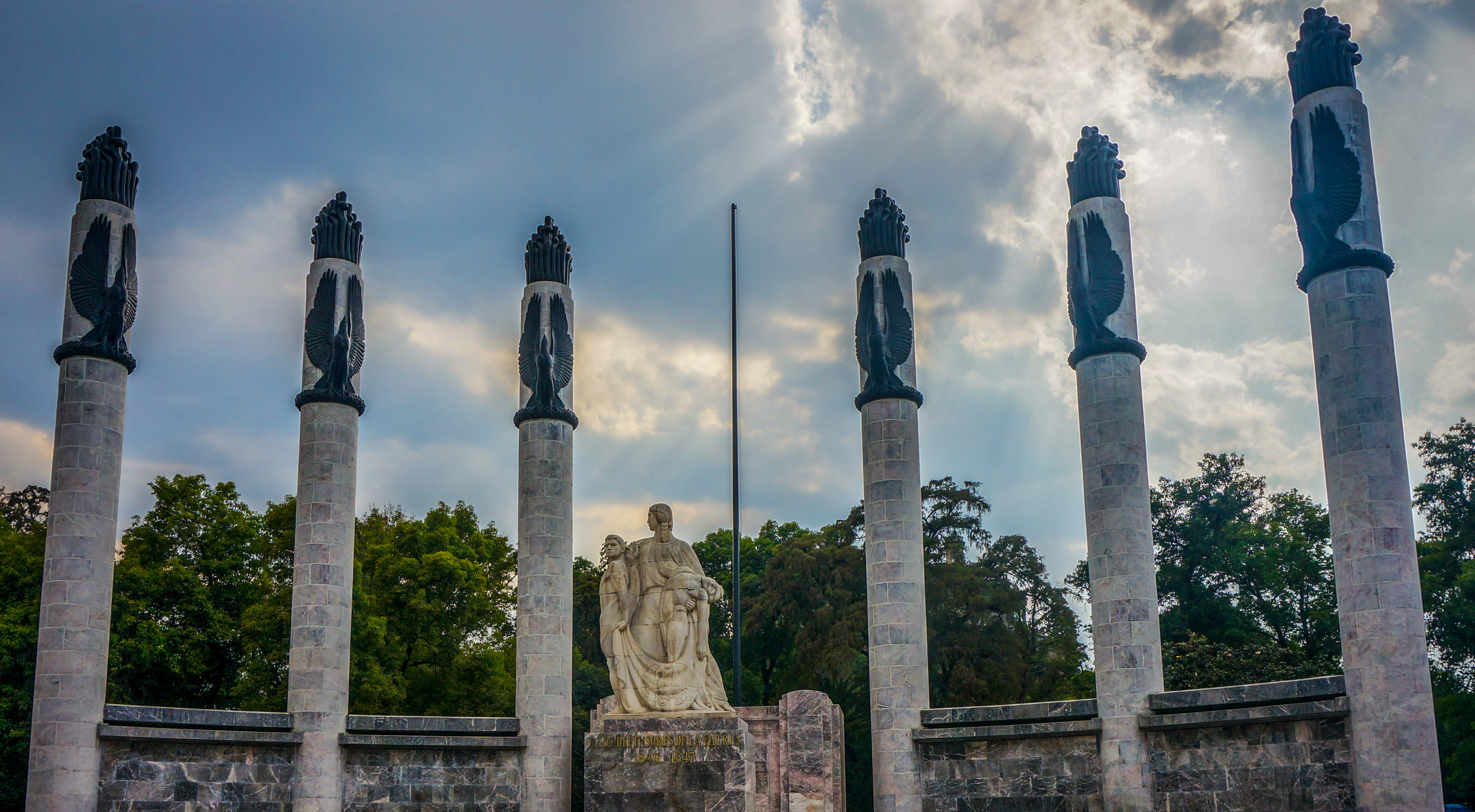
Monument to the Boy Heroes, military cadets who died in 1847, defending Mexico City during the U.S. invasion

The military history of Mexico encompasses armed conflicts within that nation's territory, dating from before the arrival of Europeans in 1519 to the present era. Mexican military history is replete with small-scale revolts, foreign invasions, civil wars, indigenous uprisings, and coups d'état by disgruntled military leaders. Mexico's colonial-era military was not established until the eighteenth century. After the Spanish conquest of the Aztec Empire in the early sixteenth century, the Spanish crown did not establish on a standing military, but the crown responded to the external threat of a British invasion by creating a standing military for the first time following the Seven Years' War (1756–1763). The regular army units and militias had a short history when in the early 19th century, the unstable situation in Spain with the Napoleonic invasion gave rise to an insurgency for independence, propelled by militarily untrained men fighting for the independence of Mexico. The Mexican War of Independence (1810–1821) saw royalist and insurgent armies battling to a stalemate in 1820. That stalemate ended with the royalist military officer turned insurgent, Agustín de Iturbide persuading the guerrilla leader of the insurgency, Vicente Guerrero, to join in a unified movement for independence, forming the Army of the Three Guarantees. The royalist military had to decide whether to support newly independent Mexico. With the collapse of the Spanish state and the establishment of first a monarchy under Iturbide and then a republic, the state was a weak institution. The Roman Catholic Church and the military weathered independence better. Military men dominated Mexico's nineteenth-century history, most particularly General Antonio López de Santa Anna, under whom the Mexican military were defeated by Texas insurgents for independence in 1836 and then the U.S. invasion of Mexico (1846–1848). With the overthrow of Santa Anna in 1855 and the installation of a government of political liberals, Mexico briefly had civilian heads of state. The Liberal Reforms that were instituted by Benito Juárez sought to curtail the power of the military and the church and wrote a new constitution in 1857 enshrining these principles. Conservatives comprised large landowners, the Catholic Church, and most of the regular army revolted against the Liberals, fighting a civil war. The Conservative military lost on the battlefield. But Conservatives sought another solution, supporting the French intervention in Mexico (1862–1865). The Mexican army loyal to the liberal republic were unable to stop the French army's invasion, briefly halting it with a victory at Puebla on 5 May 1862. Mexican Conservatives supported the installation of Maximilian Hapsburg as Emperor of Mexico, propped up by the French and Mexican armies. With the military aid of the U.S. flowing to the republican government in exile of Juárez, the French withdrew its military supporting the monarchy and Maximilian was caught and executed. The Mexican army that emerged in the wake of the French Intervention was young and battle tested, not part of the military tradition dating to the colonial and early independence eras.

Liberal General Porfirio Díaz was part of the new Mexican military, a hero of the Mexican victory over the French on Cinco de Mayo 1862. He revolted against the civilian liberal government in 1876, and remained continuously in the presidency from 1880 to 1911 (Porfiriato). Over the course of his presidency, Díaz began professionalizing the army that had emerged. By the time he turned 80 years old in 1910, the Mexican military was an aging, largely ineffective fighting force. When revolts broke out in 1910–11 against his regime, a rebel forces scored decisive victories over the Federal Army in the opening chapter of the Mexican Revolution (1910–1920). Díaz resigned in May 1911, but Francisco I. Madero, on whose political behalf rebels rose against Díaz, demobilized the rebel forces and kept the Federal Army in place. "This single decision cost [Madero] the presidency and his life." Army General Victoriano Huerta seized the presidency of Madero in 1913, with Madero murdered in the coup d'état. Civil war broke out in the wake of the coup. Huerta's Federal Army racked up one defeat after another by the revolutionary armies, with Huerta resigning in 1914. The Federal Army ceased to exist. A new generation of fighting men, most of whom with no formal military training, now fought against each other in a civil war of the winners. The Constitutionalist Army under the civilian leadership of Venustiano Carranza and the military leadership of General Álvaro Obregón were the victors in 1915. The revolutionary military men were to continue to dominate Mexico's postrevolutionary period, but the military men who became presidents of Mexico brought the military under civilian control, systematically reining in the power of the military and professionalizing the force. The Mexican military has been under civilian government control with no President of Mexico being military generals since 1946. The fact of Mexico's civilian control of the military is in contrast the situation in many other countries in Latin America.

Mexico stood among the Allies of World War II and was one of two Latin American nations to send combat troops to serve in the Second World War. Recent developments in the Mexican military include their suppression of the 1994 Zapatista Army of National Liberation in Chiapas, control of narcotrafficking, and border security.

== Pre-Hispanic era, before 1519 ==
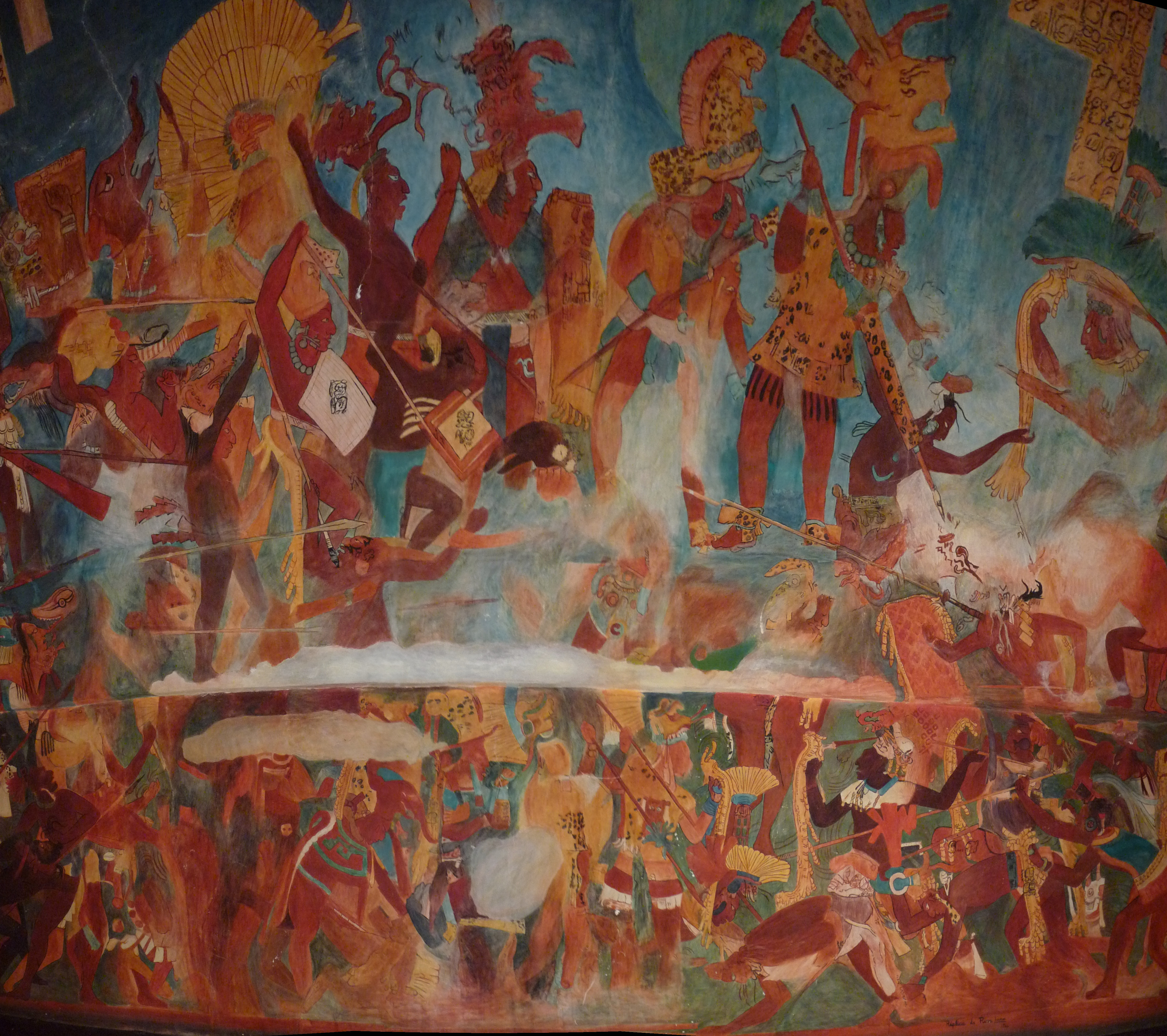
Depictions of one of the first battles in the war between Bonampak and Yaxchilan during the 6th century Tikal-Calakmul wars.

Before the arrival of Europeans in 1492, there were many large-scale civilizations in Mesoamerica that had engaged in conquest of rival powers. As civilizations arose, traditional raiding to plunder resources evolved into full-scale conquests between 300 BCE and 150 BCE, with occupying forces that could direct tribute from the conquered to the conquerors. Conquest on a grand scale only occurred with the Aztec Empire, which coalesced in the fifteenth century C.E., but smaller-scale conquests affected the rise and fall of civilizations before that. As early as Teotihuacan and Monte Albán, the first Mesoamerican states, there is evidence of local conquests of defensive walls around urban cores and conflicts resulting in large-scale sacrifice of warriors. There were cycles of conquests over many hundreds of years, resulting in the rise and decline of civilizations.

For many years, scholars depicted the Maya as peaceful, but there is ample evidence of Maya warfare in glyphic written texts and pictorials, as well as archeological evidence of "fortifications, mass graves, and militaristic iconography," indicating warfare's importance. In the 6th century, a series of wars between the Tikal and Calakmul erupted on the Yucatán. The Mayan conflict also included vassal states in the Petén Basin such as Copan, Dos Pilas, Naranjo, Sacul, Quiriguá, and briefly Yaxchilan had a role in initiating the first war. There is also evidence of conquests in the region of the Mixtecs, Zapotecs, and Purépecha (or Tarascans), which were not as extensive as the Aztec empire, but followed the same pattern on a smaller scale.

Prior to Spanish colonization, in the 15th century, several wars ensued between the Aztecs and several other native tribes. Alliances between the Aztec state and Texcoco had become central to these pre colonial wars. Several of these conflicts were evolved to an organized warfare, known as the Flower wars. In the Flower wars the primary objective was to injure or capture the enemy, rather than killing as in Western warfare. Prisoners-of-war were ritually sacrificed to Aztec gods. Cannibalism was also a center feature to this type of warfare. Historical accounts such as that of Juan Bautista de Pomar state that small pieces of meat were offered as gifts to important people in exchange for presents and slaves, but it was rarely eaten, since they considered it had no value; instead it was replaced by turkey, or just thrown away.

Perhaps the most famous of the Native Mexican states is the Aztec Empire. In the 13th and 14th centuries, around Lake Texcoco in the Anahuac Valley, the most powerful of these city states were Culhuacan to the south, and Azcapotzalco to the west. Between them, they controlled the whole Lake Texcoco area.

The Aztecs hired themselves out as mercenaries in wars between the Nahuas, breaking the balance of power between city states. Tenochtitlan, Texcoco, and Tlacopan formed a "Triple Alliance" that came to dominate the Valley of Mexico, and then extended its power beyond. Tenochtitlan, the traditional capital of the Aztec Empire, gradually became the dominant power in the alliance.

The Chichimeca, a wide range of nomadic groups that inhabited the north of modern-day Mexico, were never conquered by the Aztecs.

== Spanish conquest of Mexico ==
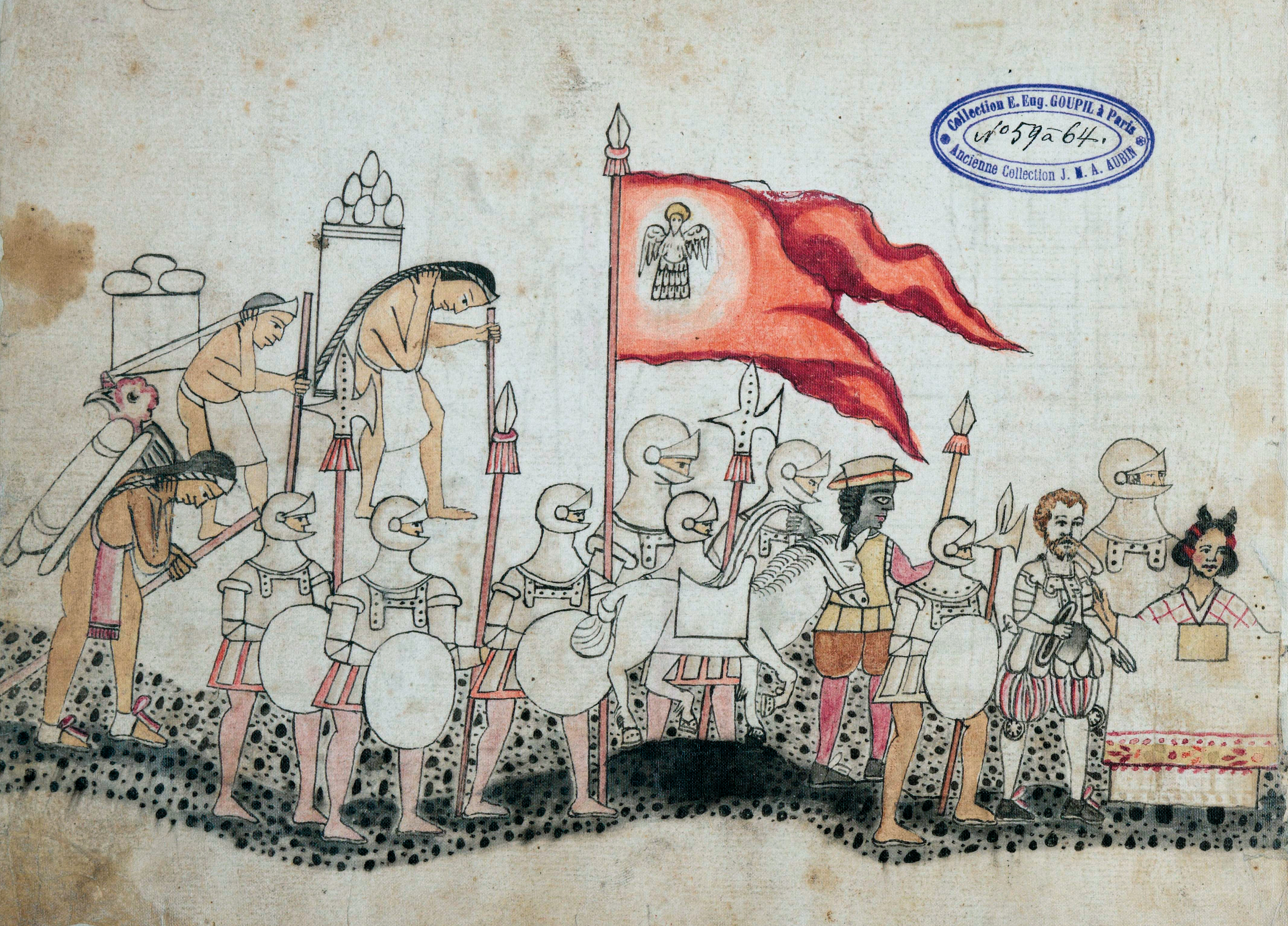
Codex Azcatitlan depicting the Spanish-Tlaxcalan army, with Cortés and La Malinche, along with an African slave in front the meeting with Aztec emperor Moctezuma II. The facing page is no longer extant.

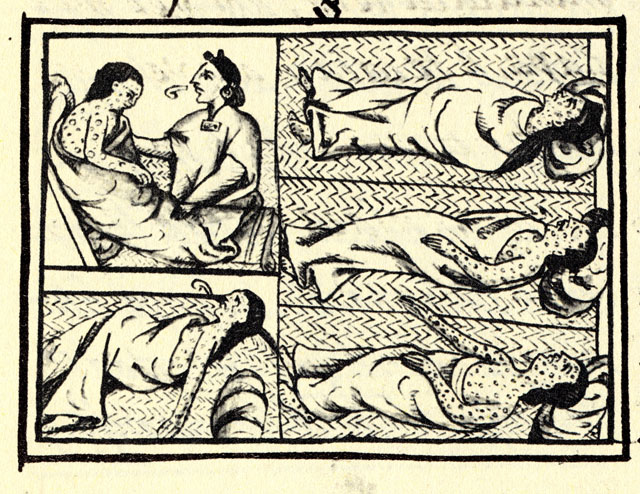
Smallpox depicted by an indigenous scribe in the Florentine Codex (1576) account of the conquest of Mexico.

The two-year Spanish conquest of the Aztec Empire (1519–1521) is the most famous episode of Spanish conquest history. It is documented in the sixteenth century by both Spaniards, their indigenous allies, and indigenous opponents shortly after the events. With arrival of Spaniards in the Caribbean in 1492, they developed patterns of conquest and settlement. From the Caribbean, they went on expeditions (entradas) of exploration, trade, conquest, and settlement. The Spanish crown issued a license for a particular leader to head an expedition, a mature man with wealth, social standing, and ambition to better his position. Explorers probed Mexico's east coast, with Francisco Hernández de Córdoba exploring southeast Mexico in 1517, followed by Juan de Grijalva in 1518. The most important Conquistadores was Hernán Cortés, a settler in Cuba who was well-connected locally. He received a license to lead an expedition of exploration only. As was standard practice for an expedition, those joining it brought their own weapons and armor, and if wealthy enough, a horse. If an entrada of conquest was successful, participants would receive shares of the spoils, with each man receiving one share, and if he was a horseman, an additional share. These expeditions were not organized armies of salaried troops funded by the crown, but groups of settlers turned bands of men in combat or soldiers of fortune, who joined with the expectation that their valor and skill in combat would be rewarded. The term "soldier" was not used by participants themselves. The leader was often called "captain", but this was not a military rank. Cortés did not want to be restricted by the license limiting him solely to exploration of Mexico's coast, and left Cuba before officials realized his ambition. For that reason, once the Spanish would-be conquerors landed on the mainland, they needed to find way to constitute themselves as a legal entity. They did so by founding the town of Villa Rica de la Vera Cruz (today's Veracruz), and constituting themselves as the city council. They chose Hernán Cortés as their captain.

The conquest of Mexico unfolded along established principles worked out by the Spanish in their twenty years of settlement and expeditions around the Caribbean. Seizing the leader of an indigenous group during a friendly parley was typical, quickly giving Spaniards the advantage. Some groups capitulated immediately and of those some became active allies of the Spanish. The small group of Spaniards realized immediately that the mainland had indigenous populations that were far denser and hierarchically organized societies. The Aztec Empire, the dominant power in central Mexico at the time of European Contact, had conquered indigenous city-states, many of which were chafing under Aztec rule and sought independent status themselves. Cortés quickly realized that he needed indigenous allies for successful conquest and found various indigenous city-states willing to take their chances with these newcomers. From the Spaniards' point of view, the standard strategy of divide-and-conquer was a workable—and winning—strategy. From the indigenous allies' point of view, they formed this alliance with the expectation of bettering their own circumstances. The most important of these allies was the city-state (Nahuatl: altepetl) of Tlaxcala, which the Aztecs had been unable to conquer. The Spanish benefited from another type of ally, an indigenous woman, Malinche or more politely called Doña Marina, who became Cortés's cultural translator. Sent into slavery as a child by her family, she was given as a gift to the Spaniards by a Maya indigenous ally. Malinche was a native speaker of language of the Aztecs, Nahuatl and had learned a Maya language in captivity. She quickly became essential in the Spaniards' ability to negotiate with potential allies and advise the Spaniards about indigenous military strategy and tactics. In sixteenth-century indigenous pictorial accounts of the conquest, such as Codex Azcatitlan, Malinche is shown as an out-sized figure in a leadership position. With their indigenous allies, the Spanish defeated the Aztec empire in a two-year long struggle. They were aided by the outbreak of a smallpox epidemic unintentionally introduced to the mainland by a black slave; the disease disproportionately affected the indigenous populations, since they had no immunity to it.

The Spaniards surrounded and laid siege to the inhabitants of the Aztec's island capital Tenochtitlan, bringing about the Aztecs' total defeat in 1521. Despite their metal weapons, horses, dogs, cannons, and thousands of indigenous allies, the Spanish were unable to subdue the Mexica for seven full months. It was one of the longest continuous sieges in world history.

Several factors contributed to Spanish victory against the Aztecs. Their alliances with indigenous city-states discontented with Aztec rule were crucial to their victory, vastly swelling the number of warriors that could be mobilized in combat. The Aztec empire was fragile politically and militarily, once it became clear that they were beatable. Spanish military technology was superior in many ways, with horses giving Spaniards the advantage in open-field warfare. Iron and steel weapons and harquebuses provided advantages. The Spanish were further aided in their conquest by the Old World diseases (primarily smallpox) they brought with them, to which the natives had no immunity, and which became pandemic, killing large portions of the native population.

== Colonial-era control without a standing military ==
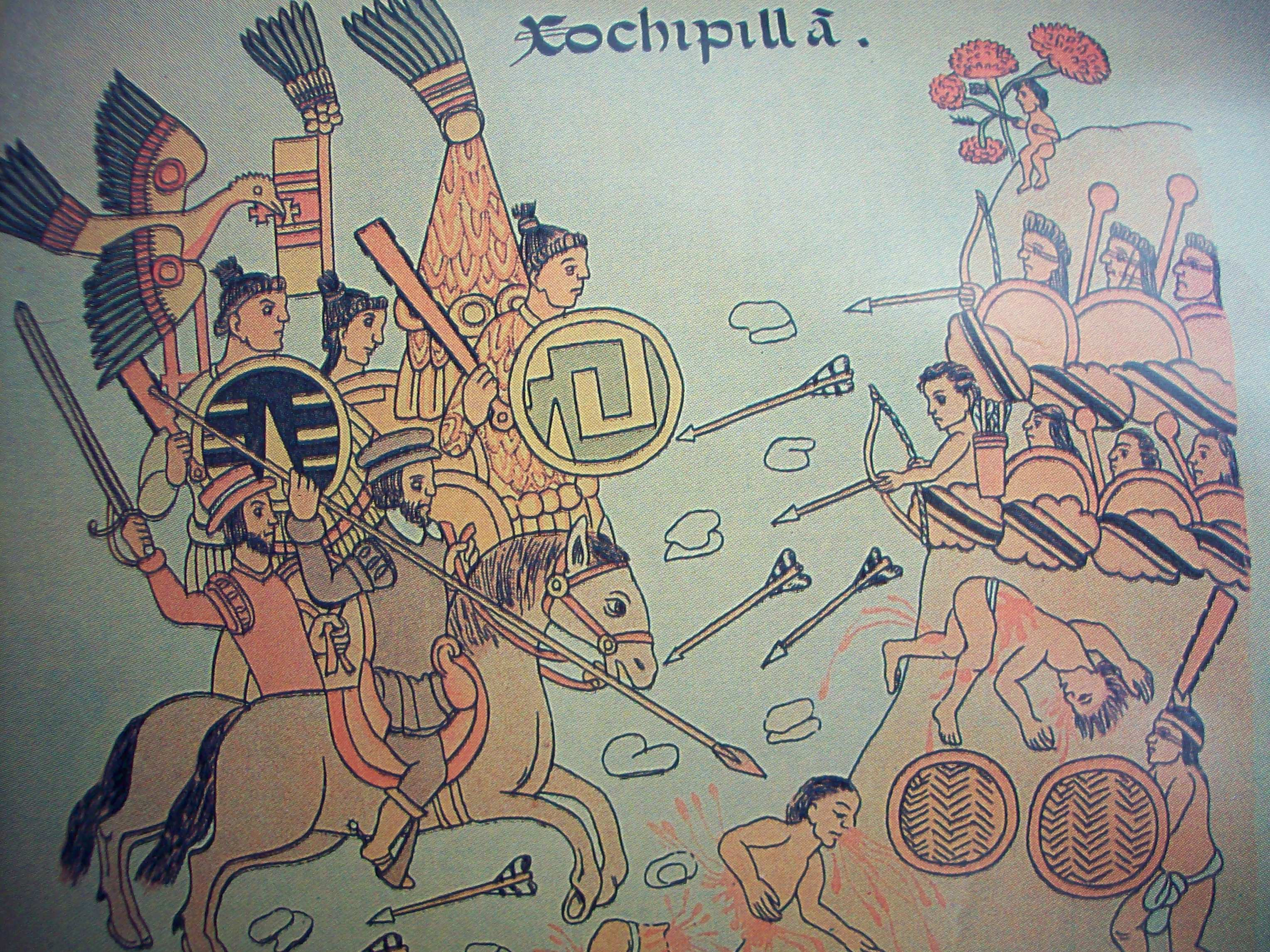
Viceroy Antonio de Mendoza and Tlaxcalan Indians battle with the Caxcanes in the 1541 Mixtón War. Source: Lienzo de Tlaxcala

Not until the Spanish empire was by foreign conquest in the eighteenth century did the Spanish crown establish a standing military. Conquests of the central Mexican indigenous civilizations was basically final in the sixteenth century, with the conquest of the Maya region more protracted. Spaniards who had participated in the conquest of central Mexico were rewarded with grants of labor and tribute from city-states which was facilitated by indigenous nobles. The institution of encomienda required the awardees to keep "their Indians" peaceful and to promote their conversion to Christianity. The status of indigenous nobles was recognized by the Spanish crown and were granted the right to carry Spanish arms and ride on horseback, prohibited to commoners. In general, once conquered, the indigenous were incorporated into the Spanish colonial empire as vassals of the crown. There were few rebellions. An exception was the 1541 Mixtón War, where an uprising in what is now Jalisco was suppressed by armed Spaniards and their loyal Tlaxcalan allies led by the highest Spanish administrator, the viceroy, Don Antonio de Mendoza.

The indigenous groups in northern Mexico, collectively called Chichimeca by the Aztecs became fierce and effective warriors against the Spanish once they acquired horses. With the expansion of Spanish exploration northward, these northern indigenous groups were not quickly or permanently subdued and block northern settlement until the discovery of large deposits of silver in Zacatecas. The high value of the silver mines and the need to secure the mining zone and the overland routes to transport silver south and supplies north meant the crown had to create a viable solution. A fifty-year long conflict, the Chichimeca War initially used the construction of presidios to place soldiers permanently to protect the trunk lines. The Spanish "war of blood and fire" (guerra de sangre y fuego) was not effective enough and the Spanish turned to a strategy of "peace by purchase," followed by peaceful Christian evangelization of the indigenous. The frontier institutions of the presidio and the Christian mission complex became standard crown-supported ways to establish and maintain Spanish control in northern Mexico.

== Establishment of a standing military, 18th c. ==
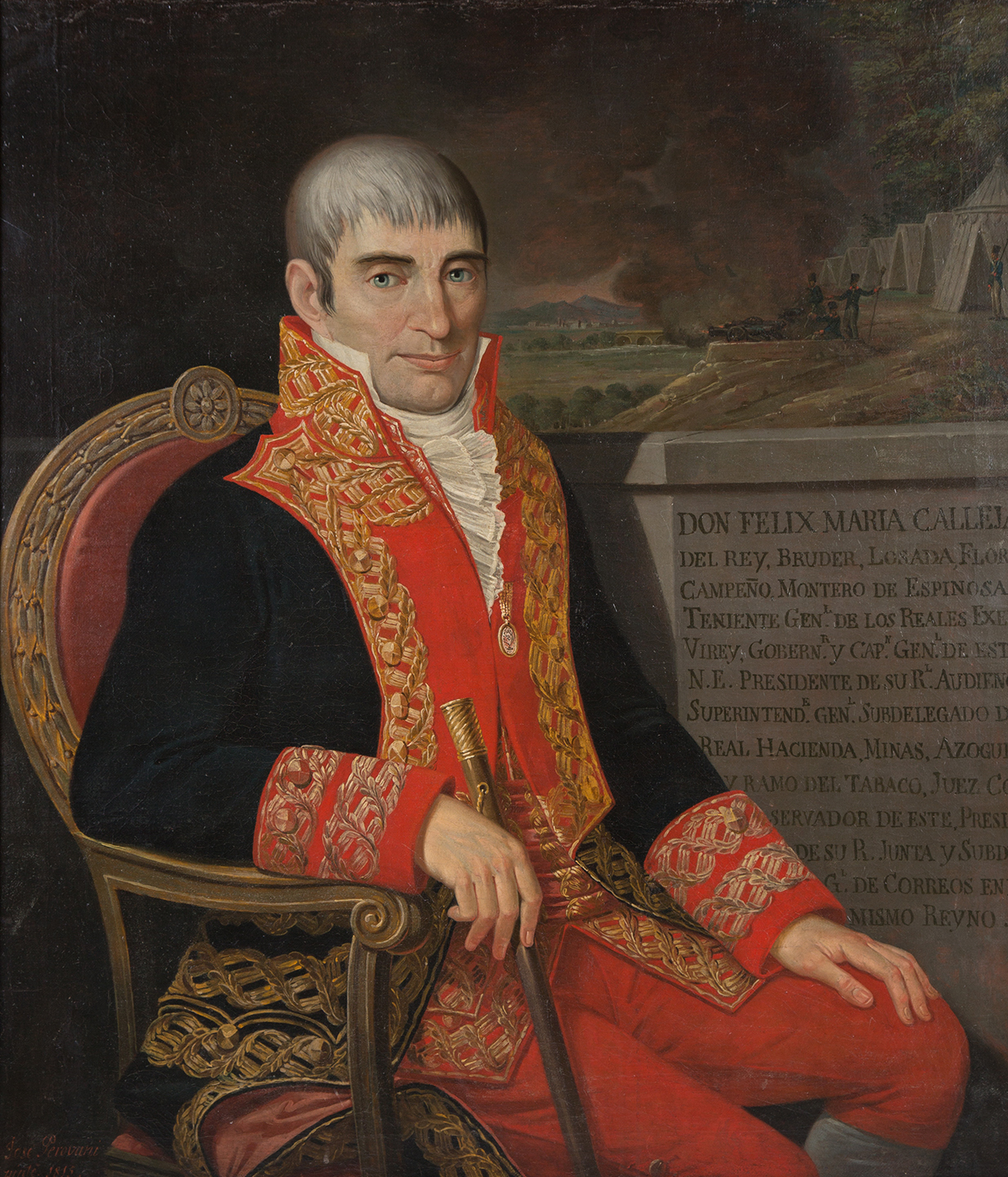
Félix Calleja, Spanish general, won victories against insurgents of the Hidalgo revolt

In the eighteenth century, the rise of rival European empires, particularly the British, threatened Spanish control of its lucrative overseas colonies. The 1762 British capture of Havana, Cuba and Manila, the Philippines in the Seven Years' War, prompted the Spanish crown to protect its colony of Mexico by establishing a standing military. The external military threat was real, but in order to establish a military, Spanish and colonial elites had to overcome the fear of arming large numbers of lower-class non-whites. Given the small number of Spaniards available for military service and the large-scale external threat, there was no alternative to enlisting dark-skinned plebeians into part-time militias or a standing military. Indians were exempt from military service, but mixed-race casta men were part of companies and there were some light- and dark-skinned Afro-Mexican companies.

In the eighteenth century, the Bourbon regime had introduced practices and reforms that systematically excluded elite American-born Spaniards from holding high civil or ecclesiastical office. There were fewer visible routes to status and privilege for these men. The establishment of the military provided such a route to recognition with the establishment of the fuero militar, the privilege of being tried before a military rather than a civilian or criminal court, no matter what the offense. Viceroy Branciforte saw the fuero as a way of attracting wealthy American-born Spaniards to the military. Many of them donated large sums to create militias, with themselves as the ranking member, funding the purchase of arms, uniforms, and equipment. The local city councils cabildos, nominated wealthy and socially prominent estate owners to be officers. What was unusual about the fuero militar from fueros of other groups was its extension to enlisted men and not just officers. The crown was concerned that such an extension to the lower ranks would the military a haven for miscreants.

== Mexican War of Independence, 1810–1821 ==
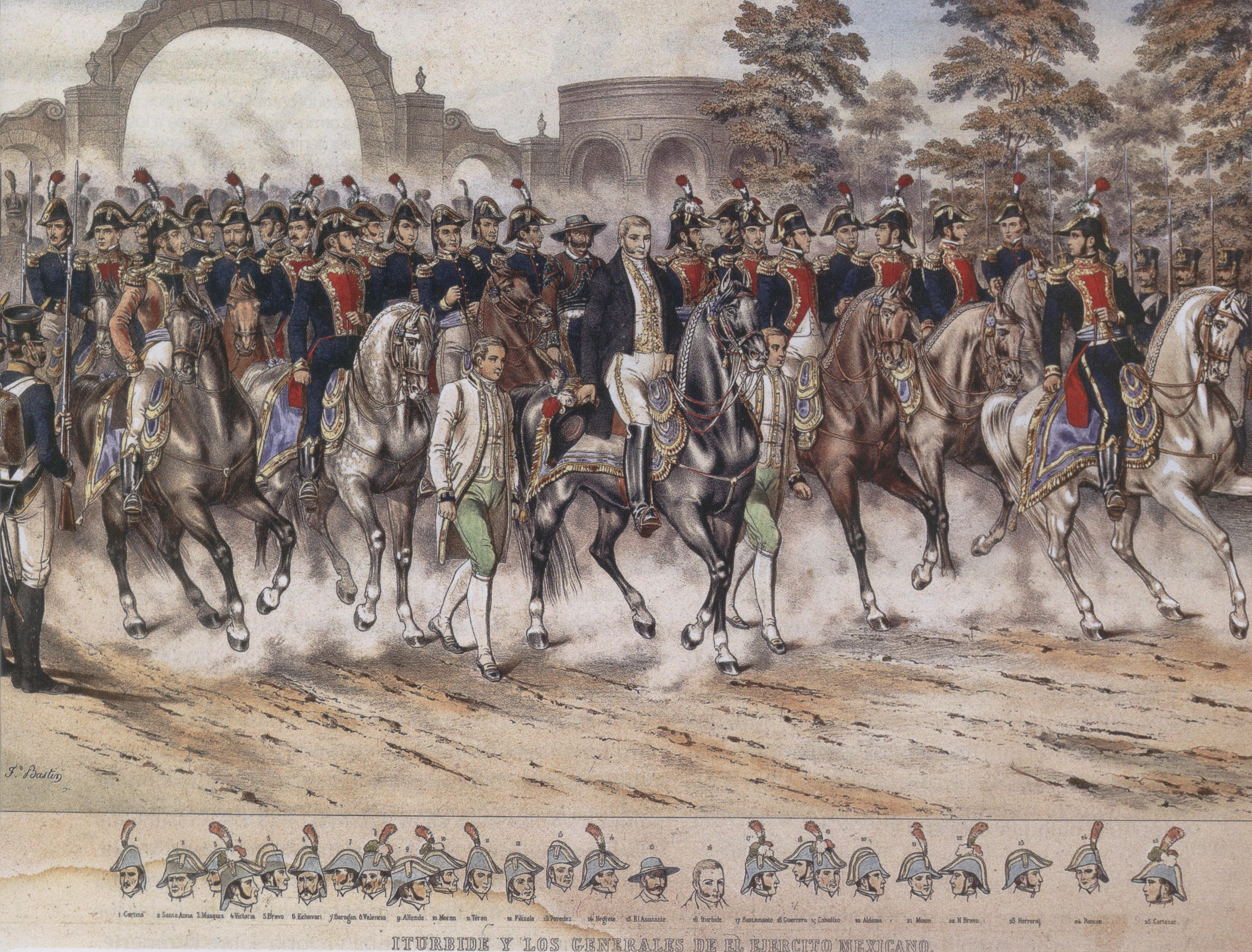
The Army of the Three Guarantees enters Mexico City. The Army was formed out of the Spanish troops led by Agustín de Iturbide and the Mexican insurgent troops of Vicente Guerrero, fought for independence against Spain.

Flag of the Army of Three Guarantees

Events in the late 18th and early 19th centuries may be best summed as to have caused the fight against the Spanish. The Criollos, or American-born rather than Spaniards born in Spain (Peninsulares) had since the eighteen-century Bourbon reforms been passed over for high posts in the civil and ecclesiastical structures; mixed-race castas and indigenous peoples were legally lower in standing with unequal access to justice and usually lived in dire poverty. Spain's debility at the start of the Napoleonic Wars, and an inability to control itself during its French occupation allowed several creole rebels to take advantage of the situation. Thus, leaders such as Simón Bolívar, José de San Martín and Antonio José de Sucre started revolutions throughout Latin America to attain independence.

Mexico's War of Independence was less straightforward than the independence movements in most of Spanish South America. In 1808 Peninsulares in Mexico City ousted the viceroy, Iturrigaray, whom they considered too accommodating to creoles' demands. In 1810 a conspiracy of creoles for independence, plotted a rising against the royal government. When it was discovered, secular priest Miguel Hidalgo called to his rural parishioners in the pueblo of Dolores for an uprising. The Grito de Dolores that had denounced bad government touched off a massive uprising by mixed-race castas and indigenous tens of thousands of unorganized followers of Hidalgo. Creole elites who had toyed with the idea of political independence rapidly withdrew their support as their property and persons were targeted for violence.

The viceroy was slow to mobilize a military response to the Hidalgo revolt. Troops had been moved to Mexico City and units suspected of sympathies for independence were demobilized. The followers of Hidalgo rapidly took San Miguel, Guanajuato, Valladolid, and Guadalajara, to the north and northwest of Mexico City. Some regional forces were caught up with the rebels in Querétaro and Michoacán. "Militiamen with their arms and wearing their Spanish uniforms marched with Hidalgo's masses. Some criollo officers, mostly provincial sublieutenants, lieutenants, and captains, attempted to discipline and organize the inchoate popular movement." The larger story, however, was that the vast majority of the royalist army remained loyal to the crown. When Félix Calleja took command of the royal forces, he won a series of decisive victories against Hidalgo's insurgent forces.

The large-scale insurgency for independence in the north was suppressed, but insurgents in southern Mexico, particularly under Vicente Guerrero turned to guerrilla warfare. Royal troops were less able to win decisive victories and the insurgency remained at a stalemale until the end of the decade. The political situation changed in Spain with a major impact on the situation in New Spain. Spanish liberals staged a coup against the absolutist monarch and for three years sought to implement the liberal constitution of 1812. In Mexico, conservatives saw this turn of events as highly unsettling and considered political independence now an option. Royalist army officer Agustín de Iturbide drafted the Plan of Iguala, calling for political independence, a constitutional monarchy, equality, and Catholicism as its core principles. He persuaded insurgent leader Guerrero to join them. Together they formed the Army of the Three Guarantees, which triumphantly marched into Mexico City in 1821. Independence from Spain was first proclaimed by Hidalgo in 1810, but it was not a political reality until 1821, when the last Spanish viceroy Juan O'Donojú signed the Treaty of Córdoba, 16 September in Córdoba, Veracruz.

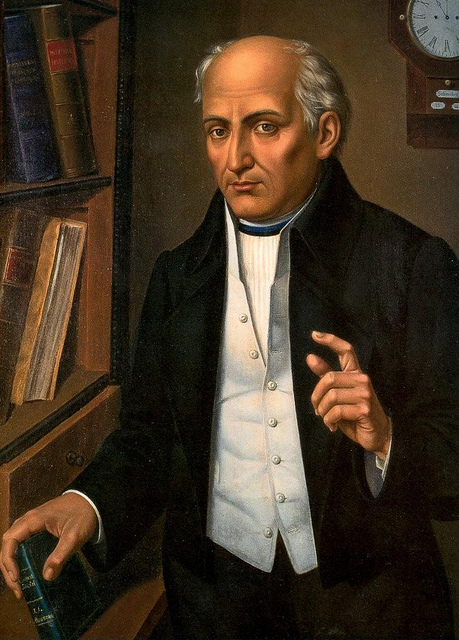
Father Miguel Hidalgo y Costilla, "father of Mexican independence" for his 1810 insurgency

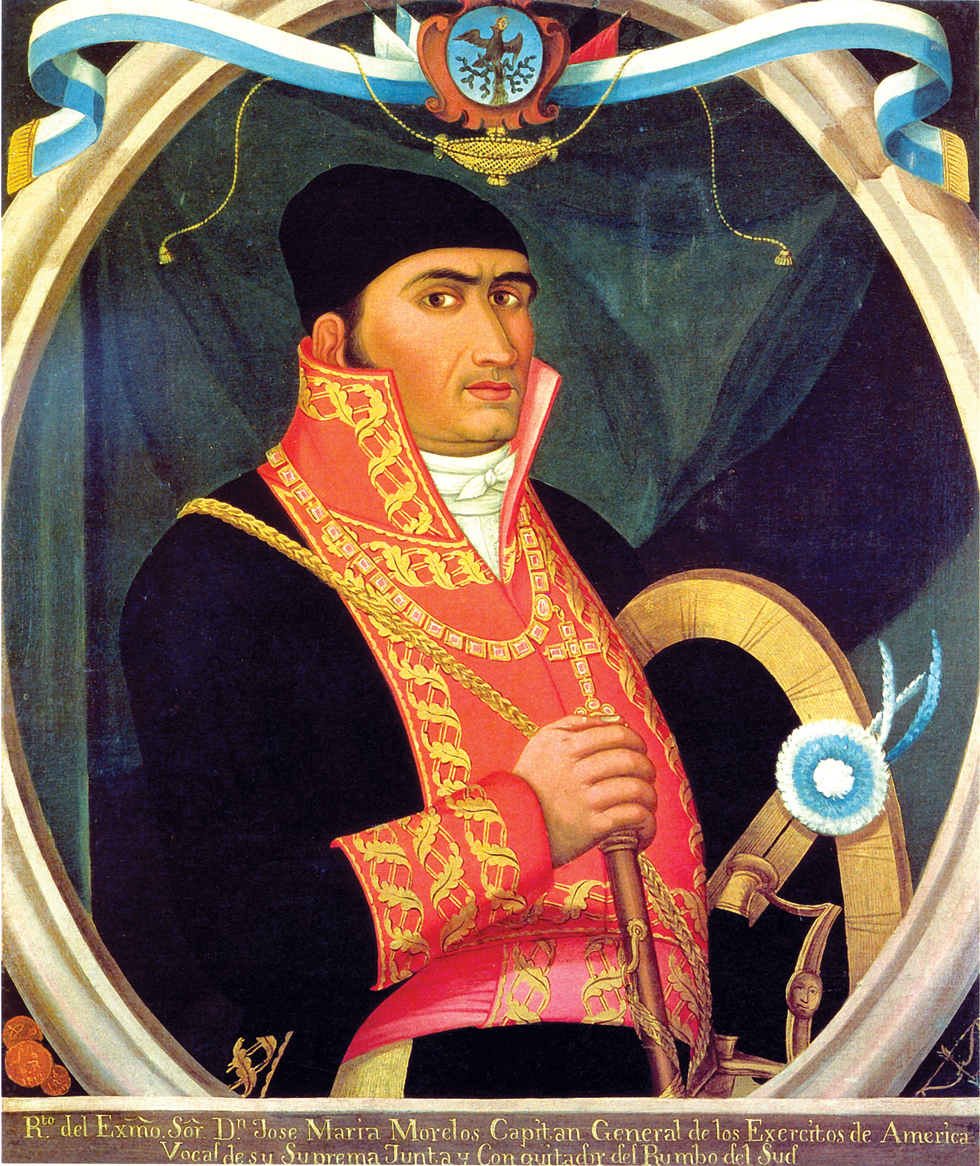
Father José María Morelos, Mexican insurgent. 1812 portrait, now in Chapultepec Castle in the Museo Nacional de Historia.

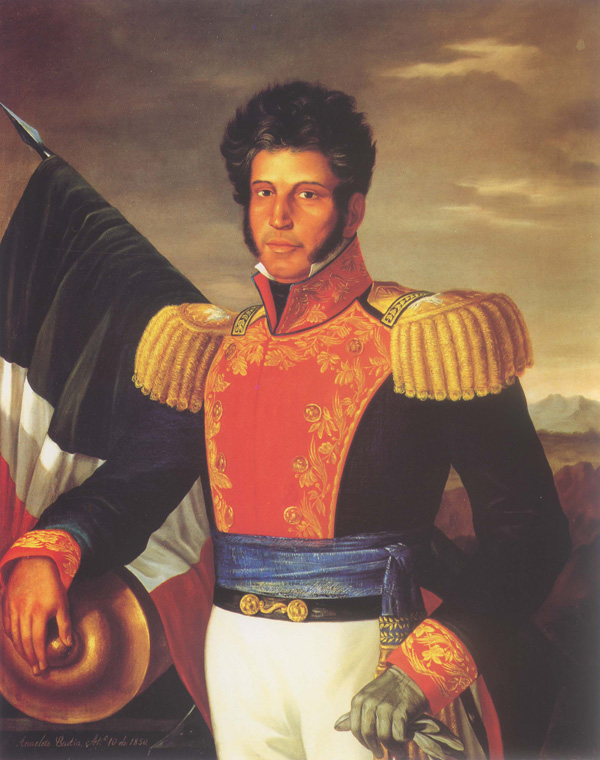
Vicente Guerrero, insurgent general who signed onto the Plan of Iguala

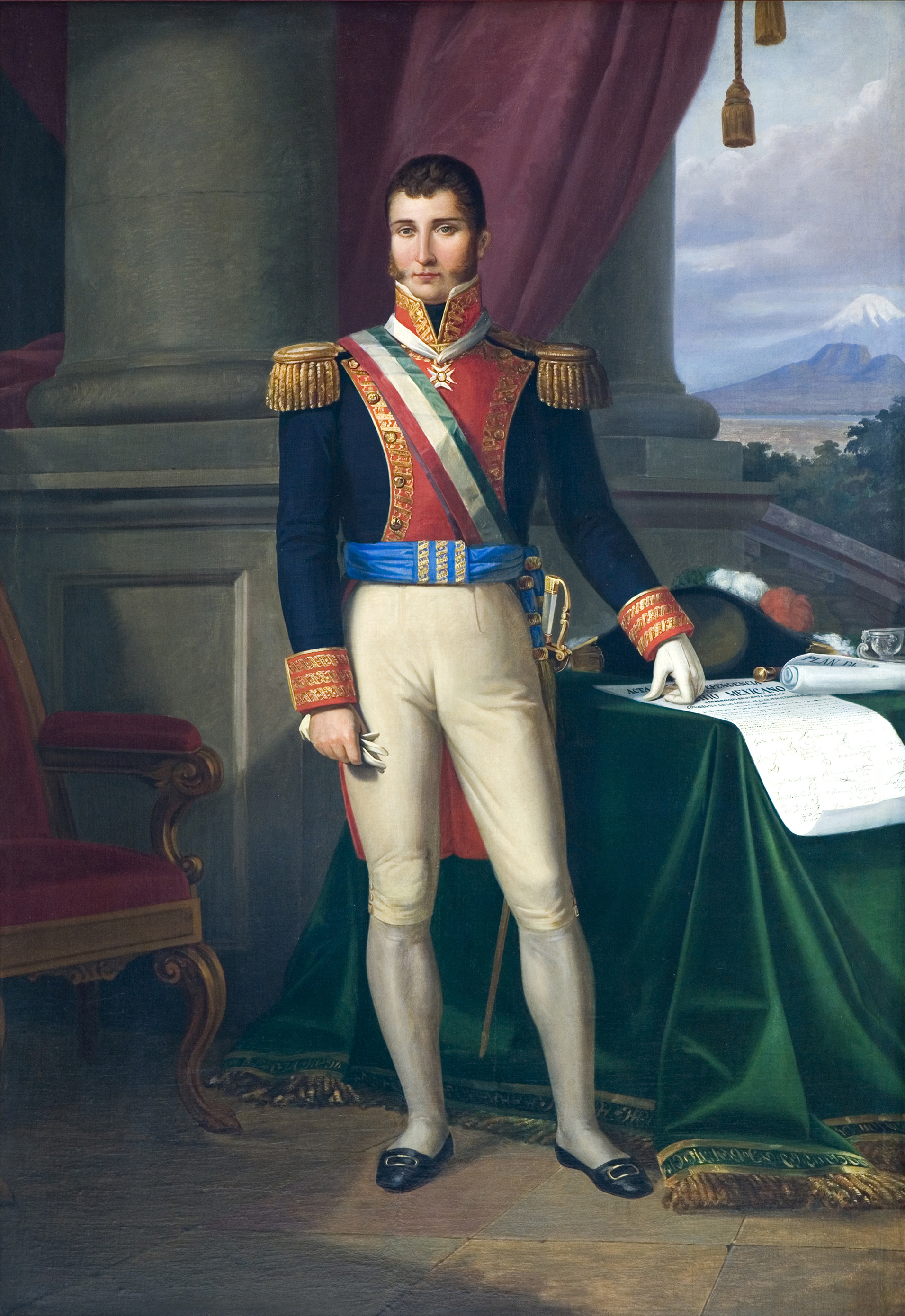
Agustín de Iturbide, royalist officer turned insurgent leader. Author of the Plan of Iguala, Emperor Agustín I, forced to abdicate and later shot returning to Mexico

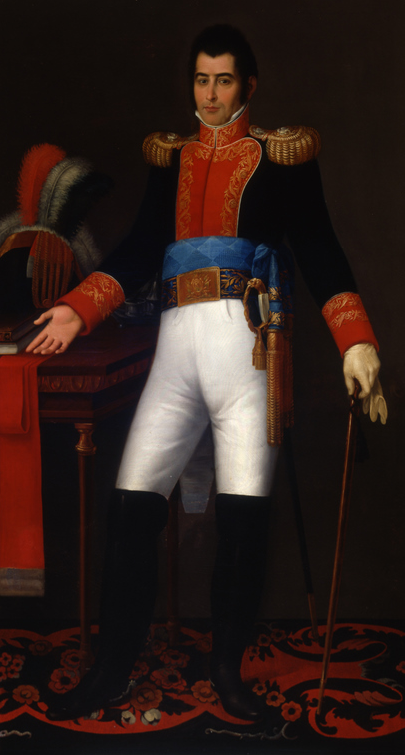
General Guadalupe Victoria, first president of the Republic of Mexico

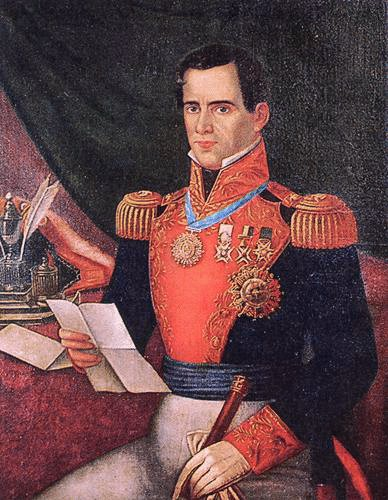
Antonio López de Santa Anna came to dominate Mexico for thirty years

== First Mexican Empire and its overthrow, 1822–1823 ==
In 1821 Agustín de Iturbide, a former Spanish general who switched sides to fight for Mexican independence, proclaimed himself emperor – officially as a temporary measure until a member of European royalty could be persuaded to become monarch of Mexico (see First Mexican Empire for more information). A revolt against Iturbide in 1823 established the United Mexican States. In 1824 Guadalupe Victoria became the first president of the new country; his given name was actually Félix Fernández but he chose his new name for symbolic significance: Guadalupe to give thanks for the protection of Our Lady of Guadalupe, and Victoria, which means Victory.

The Plan of Casa Mata was formulated to abolish the monarchy and to establish a republic. In December 1822, Antonio López de Santa Anna and Guadalupe Victoria signed the Plan de Casa Mata on February 1, 1823, as a start of their efforts to overthrow Emperor Agustín de Iturbide.

In May 1822, using military riots and pressures, Iturbide had taken the power and designated himself Emperor, initiating his government in fight with the Congress. Later he dissolved Congress and ordered opposing deputies to jail.

Several insurrections arose in the provinces and were later crushed by the army. Veracruz was spared due to an agreement between Antonio López de Santa Anna and the rebel general Echávarri.

By agreement of both heads the Plan de Casa Mata was proclaimed on February 1, 1823. This plan did not recognize the Empire and requested the meeting of a new Constituent Congress. The insurrectionists sent their proposal to the provincial delegations and requested their adhesion to the plan. In the course of only six weeks the Plan of Casa Mata had arrived at remote places, like Texas, and almost all the provinces had been united to the plan.

== Early Republic ==
=== Spanish attempts to reconquer Mexico, 1821–29 ===
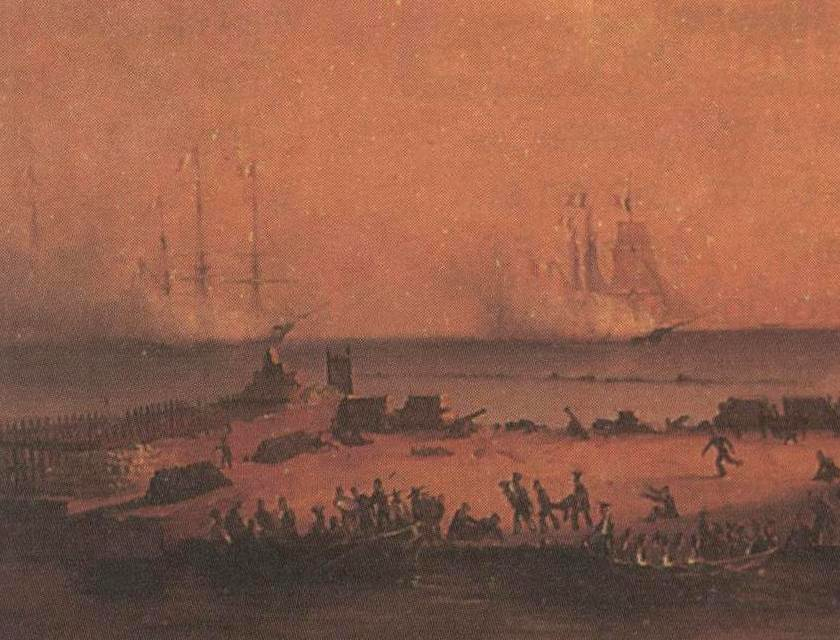
Capitulation of San Juan de Ulua, anonymous.

Spain did not reconcile itself to the loss of its valuable colony, refusing to acknowledge the Treaty of Córdoba. Spain initiated military efforts to reconquer it during the 1820s. A criollo military officer who emerged as a hero of Mexican nationalism was Antonio López de Santa Anna. In defending Mexico's independence, Santa Anna lost a leg in battle, which became the visible symbol of his sacrifices for the nation. He capitalized on this reputation to forward his political career. The early post-independence period is often called the Age of Santa Anna.

The attempts to reconquer Mexico were not successful, but not until 28 December 1836 did Spain recognize the independence of Mexico. The Santa María–Calatrava Treaty was signed in Madrid by the Mexican Commissioner Miguel Santa María and the Spanish state minister José María Calatrava.

=== Pastry War, 1838 ===
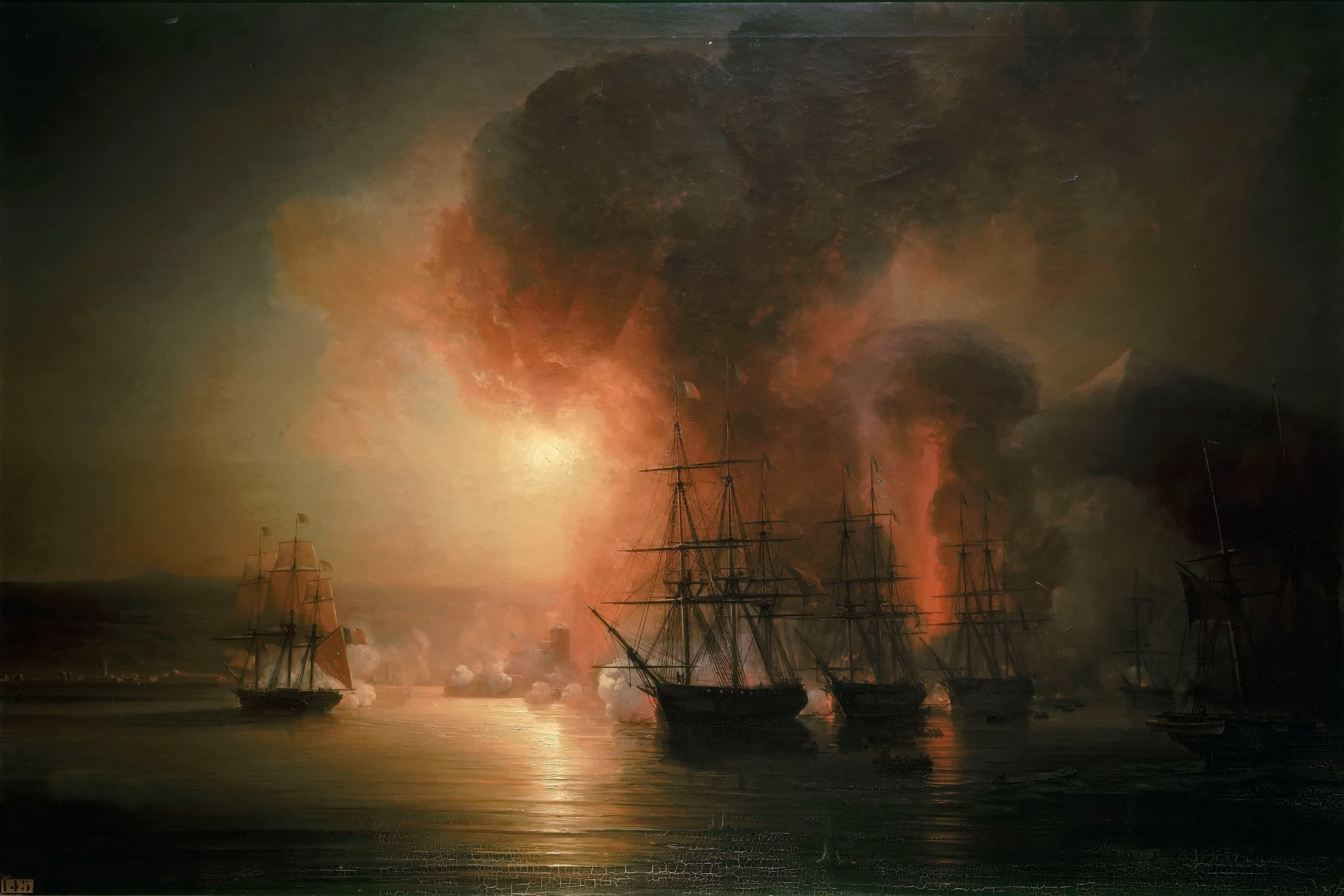
Bombardment of San Juan de Ulúa off Veracruz in 1838.

In 1838 a French pastry cook, Monsieur Remontel, claimed his shop in the Tacubaya district of Mexico City had been ruined by looting Mexican officers in 1828. He appealed to France's King Louis-Philippe (1773–1850). Coming to its citizen's aid, France demanded 600,000 pesos in damages. This amount was extremely high when compared to an average workman's daily pay, which was about one peso. In addition to this amount, Mexico had defaulted on millions of dollars' worth of loans from France. Diplomat Baron Beffaudis gave Mexico an ultimatum of paying, or the French would demand satisfaction. When the payment was not forthcoming from president Anastasio Bustamante (1780–1853), the king sent a fleet under Rear Admiral Charles Baudin to declare a blockade of all Mexican ports from Yucatán to the Rio Grande, to bombard the coastal fortress of San Juan de Ulúa, and to seize the port of Veracruz. Virtually the entire Mexican Navy was captured at Veracruz by December 1838. Mexico declared war on France. The French withdrew in 1839.

=== Texas Revolution, 1835–1836 ===
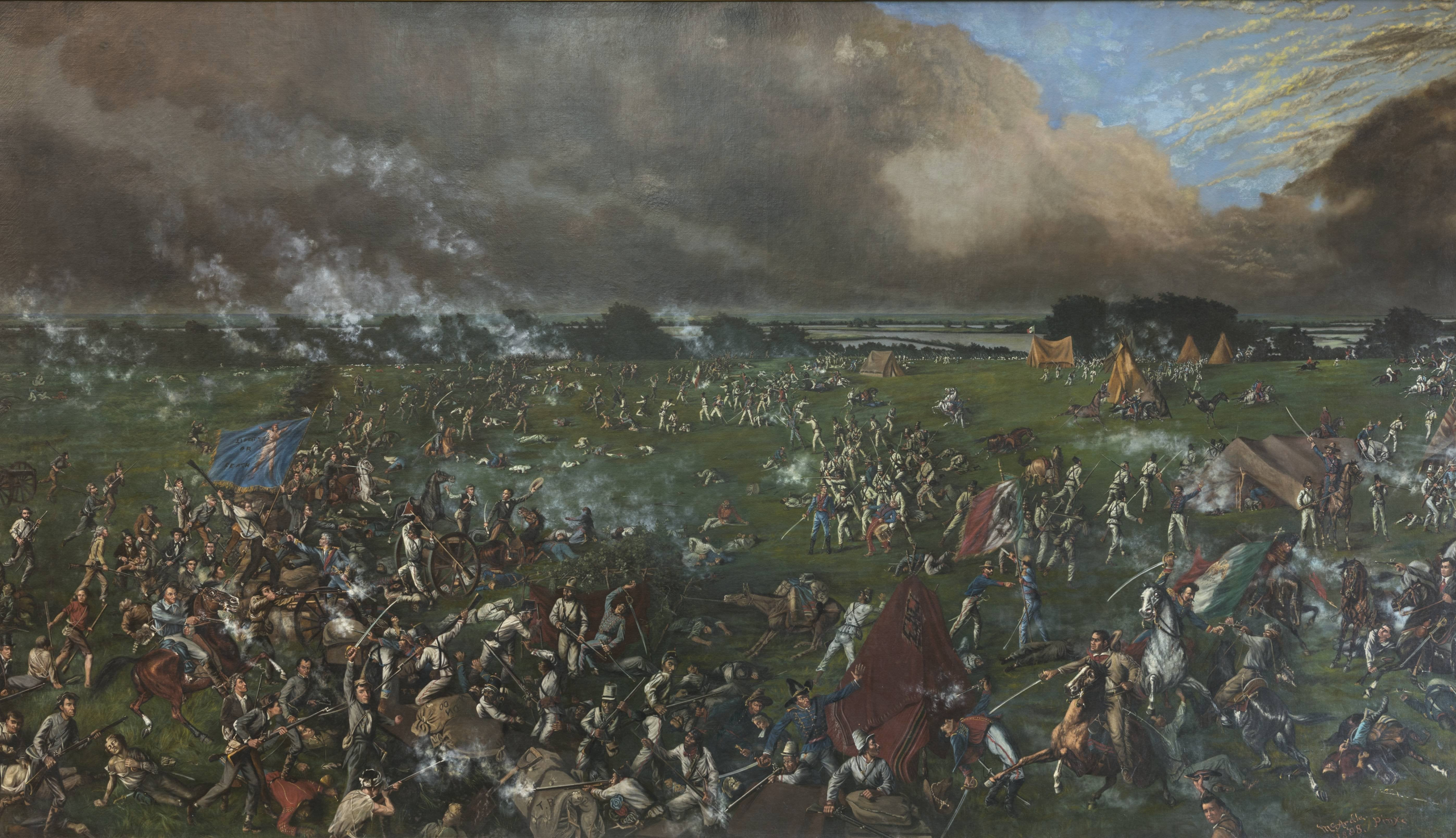
The Battle of San Jacinto in 1836, was a decisive battle that saw the end of de facto Mexican-rule over Texas.

The Texan struggle for independence marked the beginning of a conflict with the modern U.S. state of Texas, and its independence from Mexico and the state of Coahuila y Tejas. Battles associated with the conflict with Texas include the Alamo, where federal troops led by Antonio López de Santa Anna defeated the Texans, and the Battle of San Jacinto, which allowed secession to take place.

Revolts erupted throughout several states after Santa Anna's rise to power. The revolution in Texas began in Gonzales, Texas, when Santa Anna ordered troops to go there and disarm the militia. The war leaned heavily in favor of the rebels after they had won the Battle of Gonzales, captured the fort La Bahía, and successfully captured San Antonio (commonly called Béxar at the time). The war ended in 1836 at the Battle of San Jacinto (about 20 miles east of modern-day Houston) where General Sam Houston led the Texas army to victory over a portion of the Mexican Army led by Santa Anna, who was captured shortly after the battle. The conclusion of the war resulted in the creation of the Republic of Texas, a nation that teetered between collapse and invasion from Mexico until it was annexed by the United States in 1845.

=== Mexican–American War, 1846–1848 ===
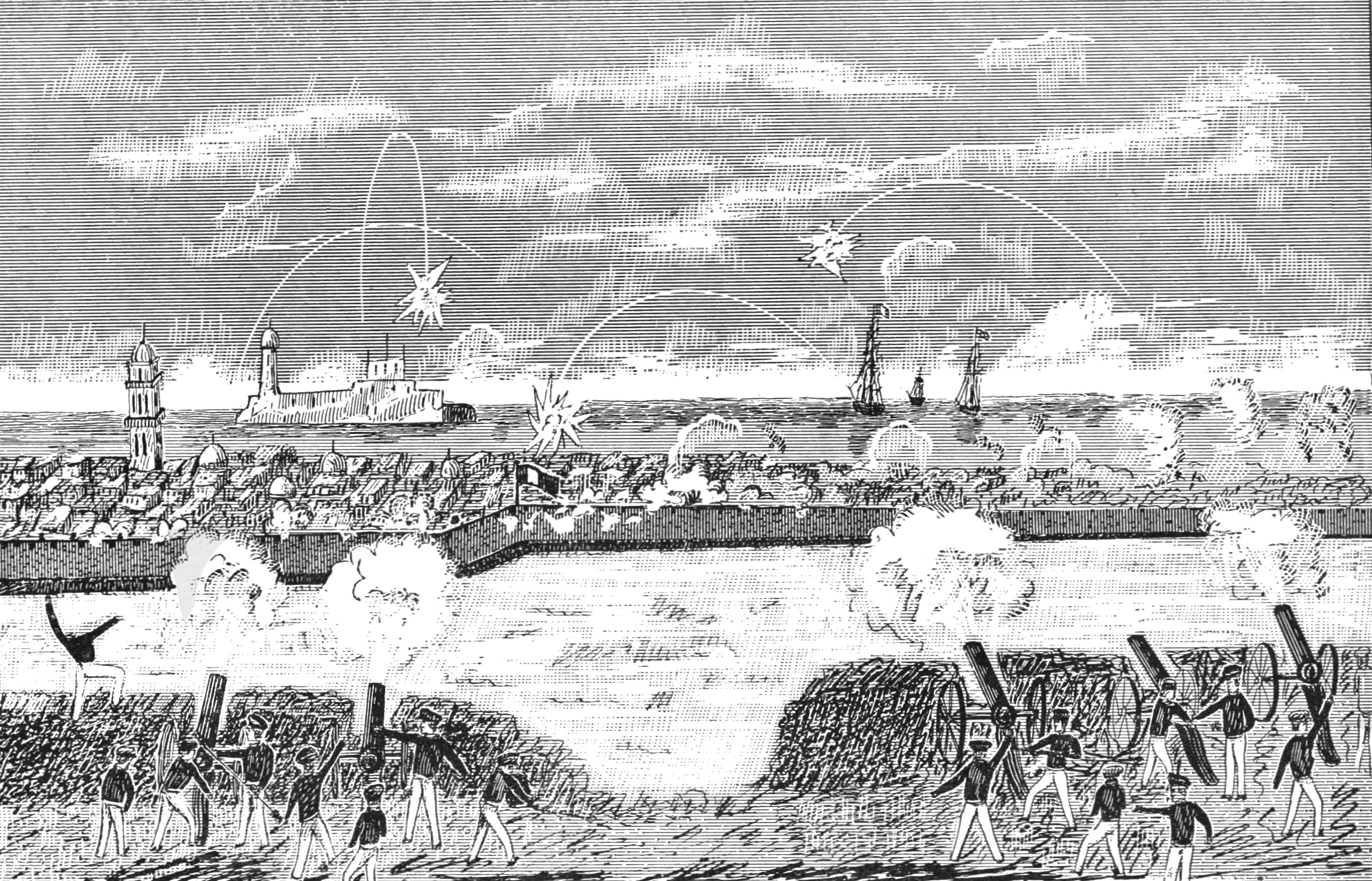
American military forces bombard Veracruz in 1847, during the siege of the city.

The dominant figure of the second quarter of 19th century Mexico was the dictator Antonio López de Santa Anna. During this period, many of the territories in the north were lost to the United States. Santa Anna was the nation's leader during the conflict with Texas, which declared itself independent in 1836, and during the Mexican–American War (1846–48). One of the memorable battles of the U.S. invasion of 1847 was when a group of young Military College cadets (now considered national heroes) fought to the death against a large army of experienced soldiers in the Battle of Chapultepec (September 13, 1847). Ever since this war many Mexicans have resented the loss of much territory, some by means of coercion, and more territory sold cheaply by the dictator Santa Anna (allegedly) for personal profit.

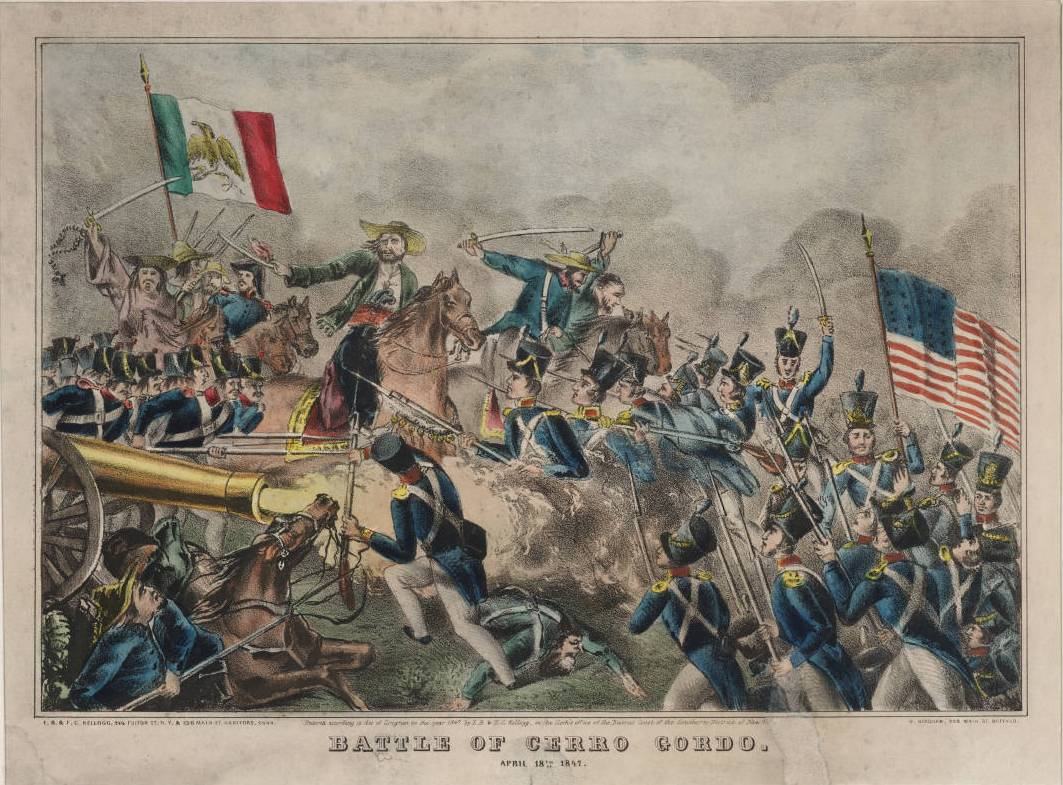
The Battle of Cerro Gordo in 1847. The battle saw American soldiers outflank Mexican soldiers.

After the declaration of war, U.S. forces invaded Mexican territory on several fronts. In the Pacific, the U.S. Navy sent John D. Sloat to occupy California and claim it for the U.S. because of concerns that Britain might also attempt to occupy the area. He linked up with Anglo colonists in Northern California controlled by the U.S. Army. Meanwhile, U.S. army troops under Stephen W. Kearny occupied Santa Fe, New Mexico, and Kearny led a small force to California where, after some initial reverses, he united with naval reinforcements under Robert F. Stockton to occupy San Diego and Los Angeles.

The main force led by Taylor continued across the Rio Grande, winning the Battle of Monterrey in September 1846. President Antonio López de Santa Anna personally marched north to fight Taylor but was defeated at the battle of Buena Vista on February 22, 1847. Meanwhile, rather than reinforce Taylor's army for a continued advance, President Polk sent a second army under U.S. general Winfield Scott in March, which was transported to the port of Veracruz by sea, to begin an invasion of the country's heartland. Scott won the Siege of Veracruz and marched toward Mexico City, winning the battles of Cerro Gordo and Chapultepec and occupying the capital.

The Treaty of Cahuenga, signed on January 13, 1847, ended the fighting in California. The Treaty of Guadalupe Hidalgo, signed on February 2, 1848, ended the war and gave the USA undisputed control of Texas as well as California, Nevada, Utah, and parts of Colorado, Arizona, New Mexico, and Wyoming. In return, Mexico received $18,250,000, equivalent to $679 million in 2025 dollars, total for the cost of the war.

=== Caste War of Yucatán, 1847–1901 ===
The Caste War lasted from 1847 to 1901, and began as a war of the Maya against the Yucatecos, a colloquial name for people of non-Maya ancestry that settled in the region. Nowadays "Yucatecos" is the demonym given to people who live in the state of Yucatán.

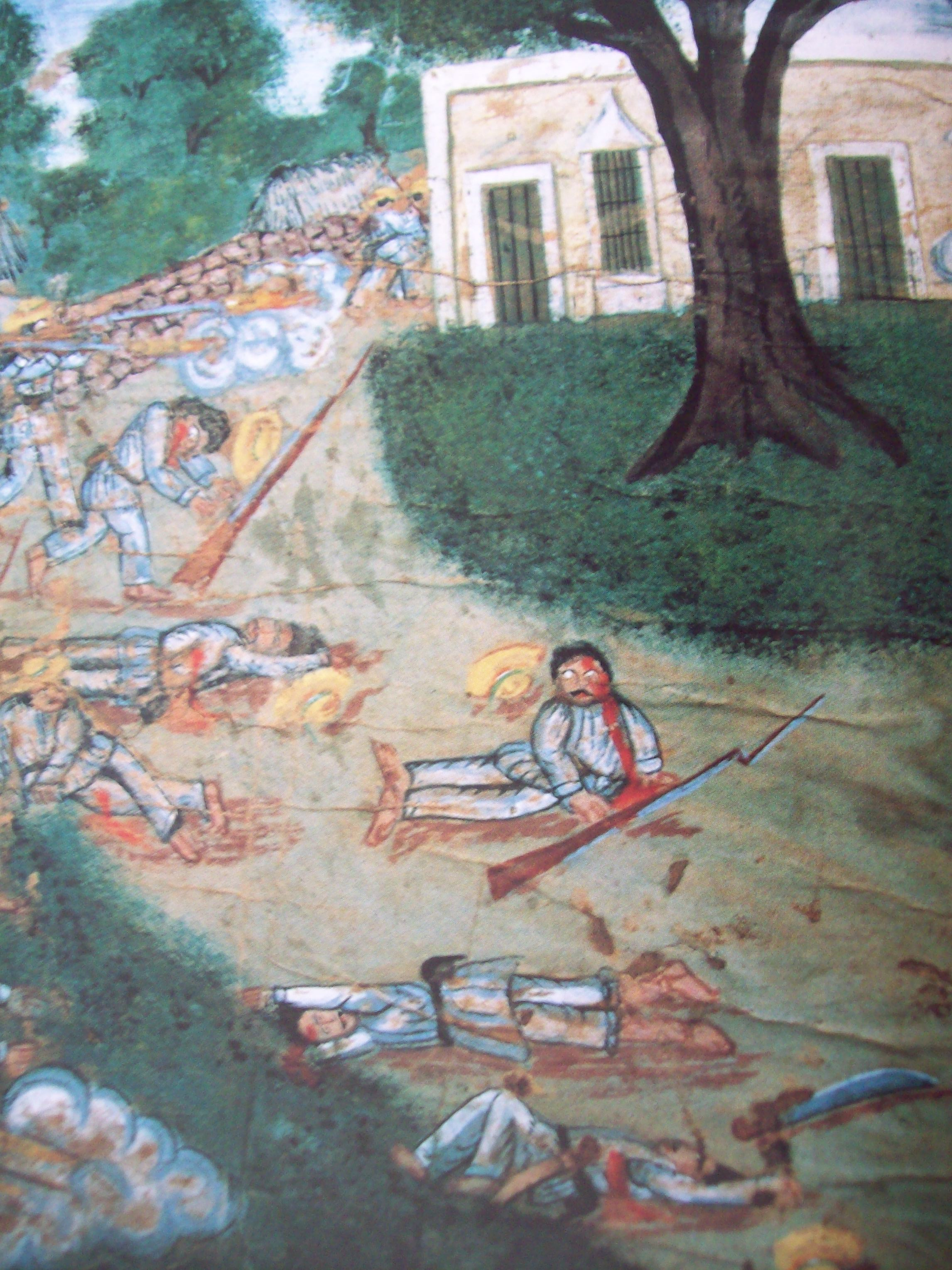
An oil painting depiction of the Caste War of Yucatán. The conflict was between the Maya people of the Yucatán, and the Mexican state.

The Maya revolt reached its peak of success in the spring of 1848 by driving the Europeans from all the Yucatán Peninsula, with the exception of the walled cities of Campeche and Mérida and a stronghold between the road from Mérida and Sisal.

The Yucatecan governor Miguel Barbachano had prepared a decree for the evacuation of Mérida, but was apparently delayed in publishing it by the lack of suitable paper in the besieged capital. The decree became unnecessary when the republican troops suddenly broke the siege and took the offensive with major advances. The majority of the Maya troops, not realizing the unique strategic advantage of their situation, had left the lines to plant their crops, planning to return after planting.

Yucatán had considered itself an independent nation, but during the crisis of the revolt had offered sovereignty to any nation that would aid in defeating the Indians. The Mexican government was in a rare position of being cash rich from payment by the United States under the Treaty of Guadalupe Hidalgo for the territory taken in the Mexican–American War, and accepted Yucatán's offer. Yucatán was officially reunited with Mexico on 17 August 1848. European Yucateco forces rallied, aided by fresh guns, money, and troops from Mexico, and pushed back the Maya from more than half of the state.

In the 1850s a stalemate developed, with the Yucatecan government in control of the north-west, and the Maya in control of the south-east, with a sparsely populated jungle frontier in between.

In 1850, the Maya of the south east were inspired to continue the struggle by the apparition of the "Talking Cross". This apparition, believed to be a way in which God communicated with the Maya, dictated that the War continue. Chan Santa Cruz (Small Holy Cross) became the religious and political center of the Maya resistance and the rebellion came to be infused with religious significance. Chan Santa Cruz also became the name of the largest of the independent Maya states, as well as the name of the capital town. The followers of the Cross were known as "Cruzob".

The government of Yucatán first declared the war over in 1855, but hopes for peace were premature. There were regular skirmishes, and occasional deadly major assaults into each other's territory, by both sides. The United Kingdom recognized the Chan Santa Cruz Maya as a de facto independent nation, in part because of the major trade between Chan Santa Cruz and British Honduras.

Negotiations in 1883 led to a treaty signed on 11 January 1884 in Belize City by a Chan Santa Cruz general and the vice-Governor of Yucatán recognizing Mexican sovereignty over Chan Santa Cruz in exchange for Mexican recognition of Chan Santa Cruz leader Crescencio Poot as "Governor" of the "State" of Chan Santa Cruz, but the following year there was a coup d'état in Chan Santa Cruz, and the treaty was declared cancelled.

== Era of the Liberal Reform ==
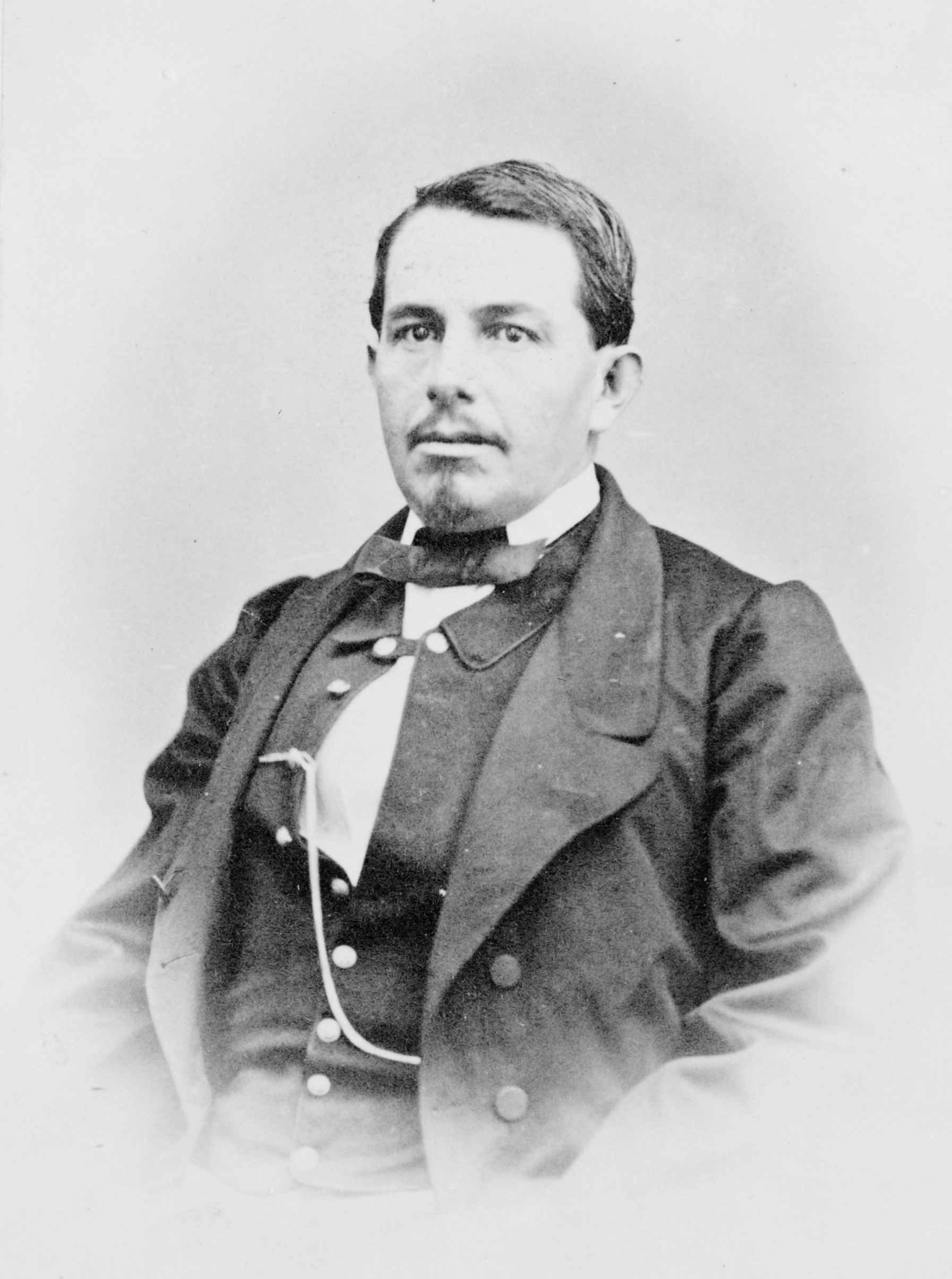
Miguel Negrete part of the military, during the civil wars of the 19th century

This period was the only one in the nineteenth century with civilian control of the government, but it was not a peaceful era, with a civil war and the foreign invasion of the French and monarchy supported by Mexico's Conservatives, followed by the restoration of the Liberal Republic.

=== Overthrow of Santa Anna in the Revolution of Ayutla, 1855 ===
The Revolution of Ayutla was an 1854 plan to overthrow the Santa Anna regime by the revolutionary Benito Juárez during his exile in New Orleans, Louisiana. The revolution sustained much support among intellectuals. This tension led to the final resignation of Santa Anna in 1855. Juan Álvarez led a provisional government after Santa Anna's final resignation, and the Revolution of Ayutla became one of the leading factors in the Reform War.

=== The Reform War, 1857–1860 ===
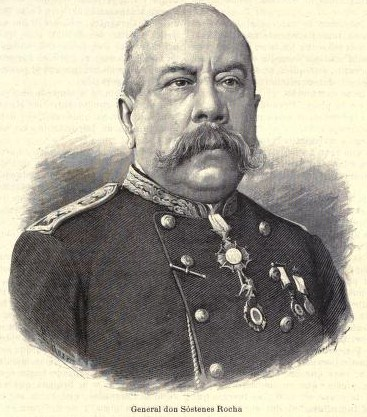
Sóstenes Rocha the most conspicuous soldier in the liberal army.

In 1855 Ignacio Comonfort, leader of the self-described Moderates, was elected president. The Moderados tried to find a middle ground between the nation's Liberals and Conservatives. During Comonfort's presidency a new Constitution was drafted. The Constitution of 1857 sought to establish equality before the law, so that the abolition of fueros, the special privileges of corporate groups, were abolished, including the fuero militar. Such reforms were unacceptable to the leadership of the clergy and the Conservatives, Comonfort and members of his administration were excommunicated and a revolt was declared. This led to the War of Reform, from December 1857 to January 1861. This civil war became increasingly bloody and polarized the nation's politics. Many of the Moderados came over to the side of the Liberales, convinced that the great political power of the Church needed to be curbed. For some time the Liberals and Conservatives had their own governments, the Conservatives in Mexico City and the Liberals headquartered in Veracruz. The war ended with Liberal victory on the battlefield, and Liberal president Benito Juárez moved his administration to Mexico City. But that was not the end of the conflict between Liberals and Conservatives, which was to carry on through another seven

=== French Intervention, 1862–1867 ===
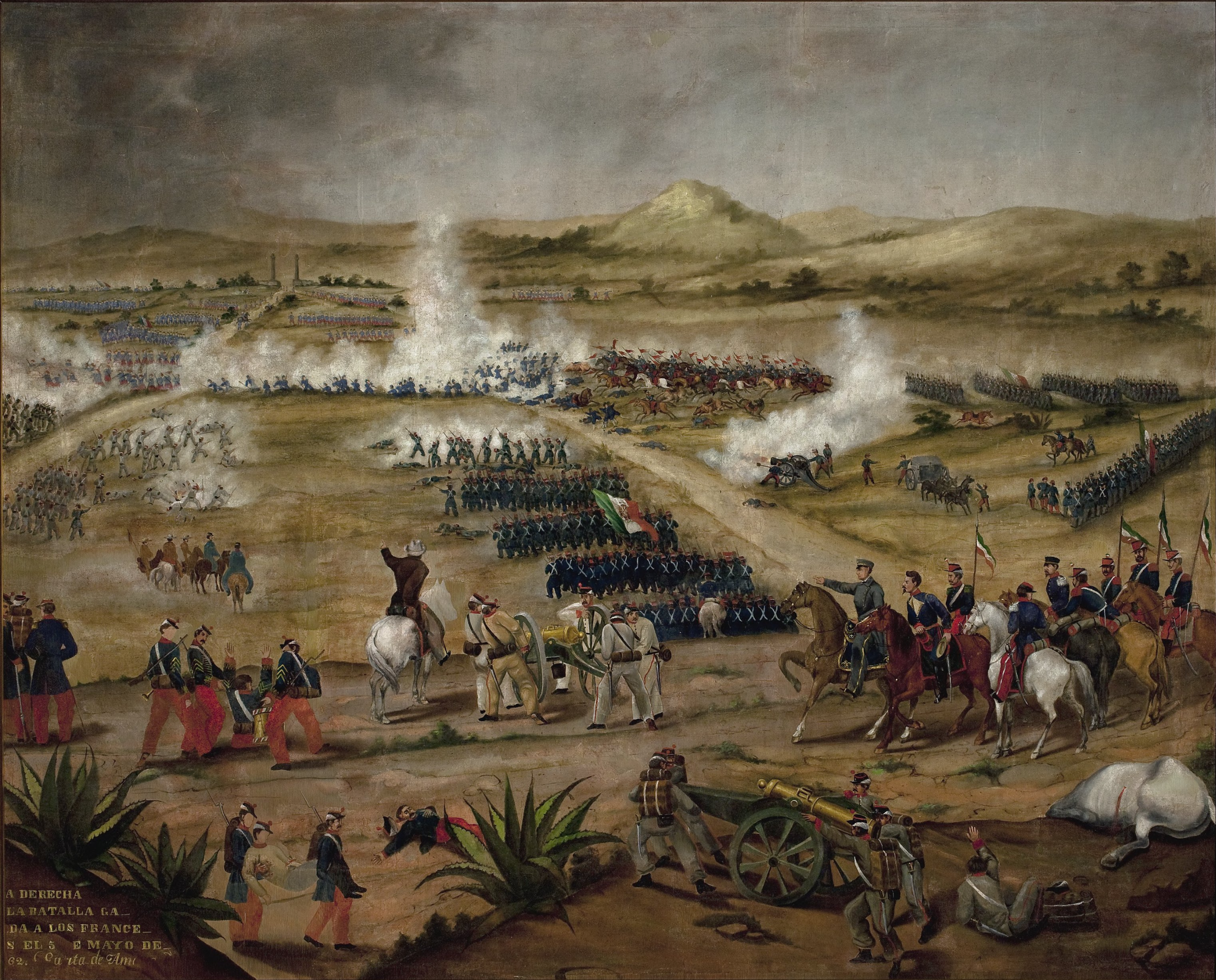
The Battle of Puebla in 1862. The battle was an inspirational event for wartime Mexico, and slowed the French advanced to Mexico City.

When Juárez repudiated the debts incurred by the rival conservative Mexican government in 1861, Mexican conservatives and European powers, especially France took the opportunity to place a European monarch as head of state in Mexico. The French sent an invading army in 1862, while the U.S. was engaged in its civil war (1861–65).

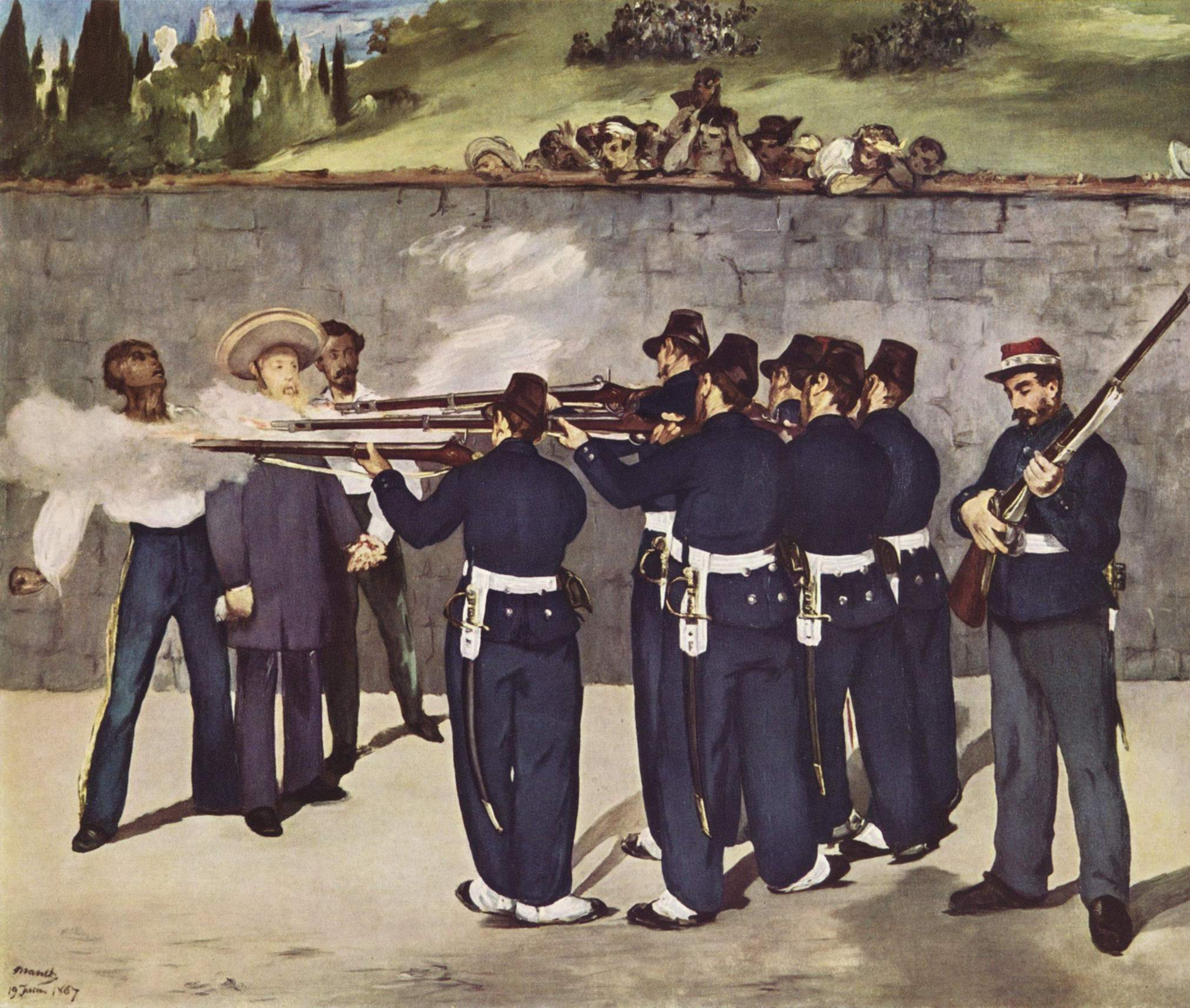
The Execution of Emperor Maximilian, Édouard Manet 1868. Mexican General Tomás Mejía, left, Maximilian, center, Mexican General Miguel Miramón right.

Although the French, then considered one of the most efficient armies of the world, suffered an initial defeat in the Battle of Puebla on May 5, 1862 (now commemorated as the Cinco de Mayo holiday) they eventually defeated loyalist government forces led by General Ignacio Zaragoza and enthroned Archduke Maximilian as Emperor of Mexico. Maximilian of Habsburg favored the establishment of a limited monarchy sharing powers with a democratically elected congress. This was too liberal to please the Conservatives, while the liberals refused to accept a monarch, leaving Maximilian with few enthusiastic allies within Mexico. When the Civil War ended in 1865, the United States sent military aid to Juárez's government. In 1867, the French withdrew their military support of Maximilian, who refused the opportunity to return to Europe. He was captured and executed on the Cerro de las Campanas, Querétaro, by the forces loyal to President Benito Juárez.

=== Restored Republic under Juárez and the overthrow of Lerdo ===
Juárez's republic was restored. However, liberal General Porfirio Díaz, a hero of the Battle of Puebla during the French Intervention, challenged civilian liberal president Benito Juárez following fall of the French empire of Maximilian Hapsburg that had been propped up by the French government. After Juárez died in office of a heart attack, Sebastián Lerdo de Tejada became president. Díaz then challenged him when Lerdo ran for election; Díaz issued the Plan of Tuxtepec, successfully overthrowing him in 1876.

== Porfiriato (1876–1911) ==
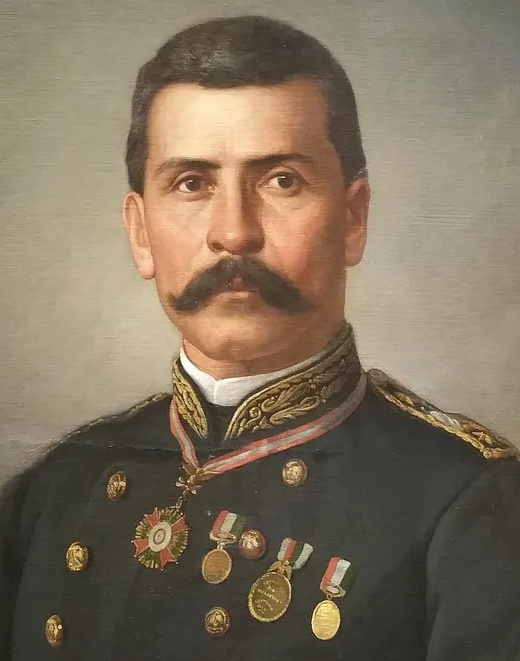
General Porfirio Díaz in 1867

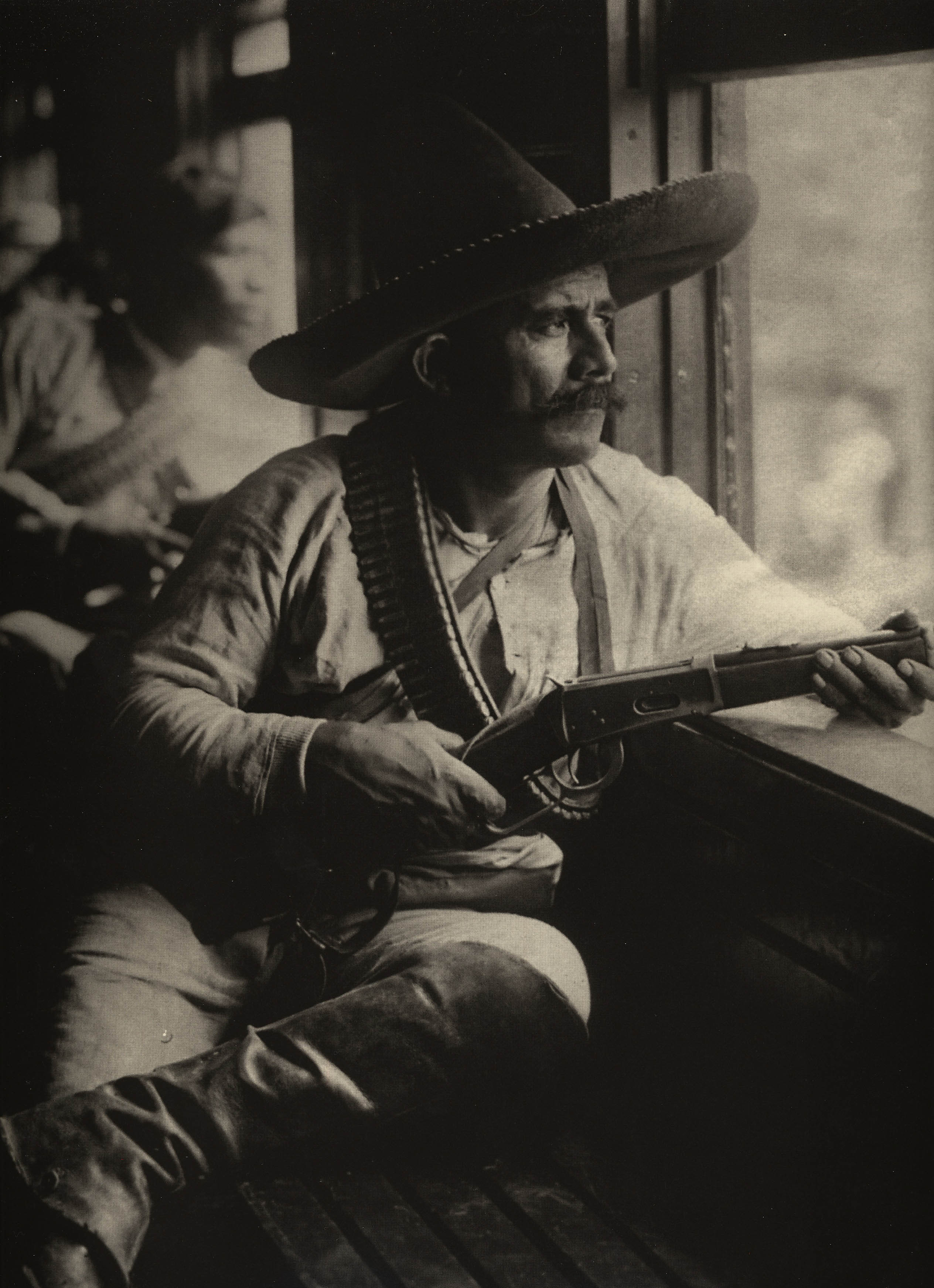
Ruralan policeman on board a train.

General Díaz came to the presidency by coup, and then there was an election after the fact. The thirty years of his presidency, known as the Porfiriato, was a self-proclaimed era of "Order and Progress." Díaz brought order, sometimes through brutal suppression of uprisings, that gave entrepreneurs confidence to invest in Mexico's modernization. In 1880 at the end of his term, Díaz stepped away from the presidency, and his fellow liberal general, Manuel González, became president of Mexico. In 1884, Díaz returned to the presidency, where he remained in continuous power until 1911. Díaz saw the regular army as a potential threat to his vision of Mexico and his own regime; its budget absorbed a huge amount of the national budget. "He reduced the size of the officer corps and the total strength of the army from a theoretical 30,000 to 20,000." He began to expand the size and role of the elite rural military police, the rurales, placing them under his direct control. The Army remained, but it was increasingly an aging and less efficient or effective fighting force. Díaz was a modernizing, liberal authoritarian, who sought Mexico's development through "order and progress." Peace in Mexico was the key to attracting foreign investment. A major infrastructure project that facilitated that was the construction of a railway network in Mexico, with telegraph lines built along track beds. Rural policemen and their horses could be put on trains and sent to remote areas to suppress rebellions and re-establish order.

== Mexican Revolution 1910–1920 ==
=== Revolutionary forces defeat Díaz ===
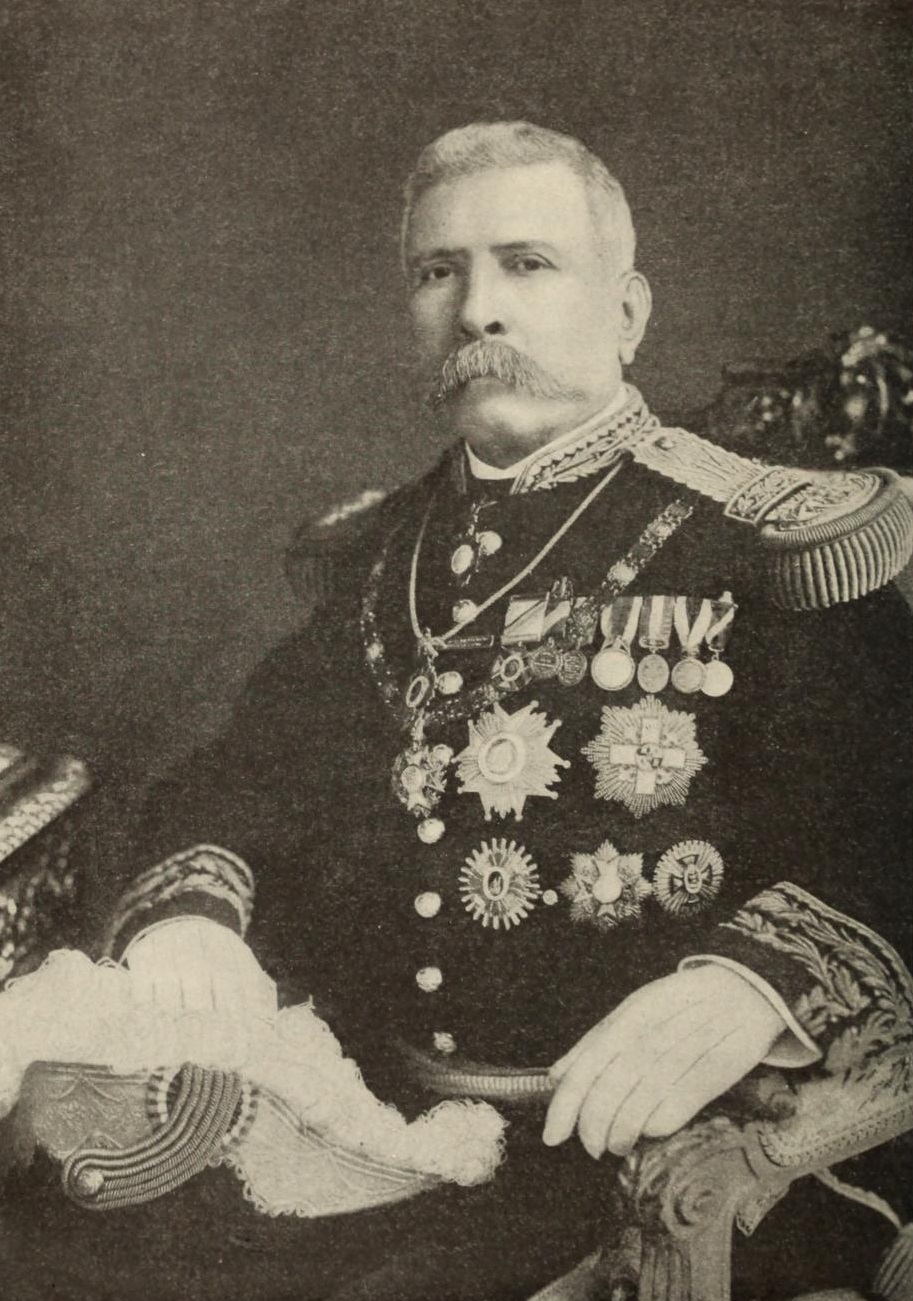
Porfirio Díaz ca. 1910 when he was 80 years old and in power since 1876

The decade-long conflict of the Mexican Revolution saw the Mexican Federal Army pitted against the coalition of revolutionary forces in northern Mexico, the Constitutionalist Army led by Venustiano Carranza, and the armed peasantry in the south, led by Emiliano Zapata. The outbreak of the Revolution was a protest against the three-decade regime of Porfirio Díaz. It was unexpectedly successful in ousting Díaz in 1911, a surprise even to the revolutionary forces.

=== Military and the Madero, 1911-13 ===
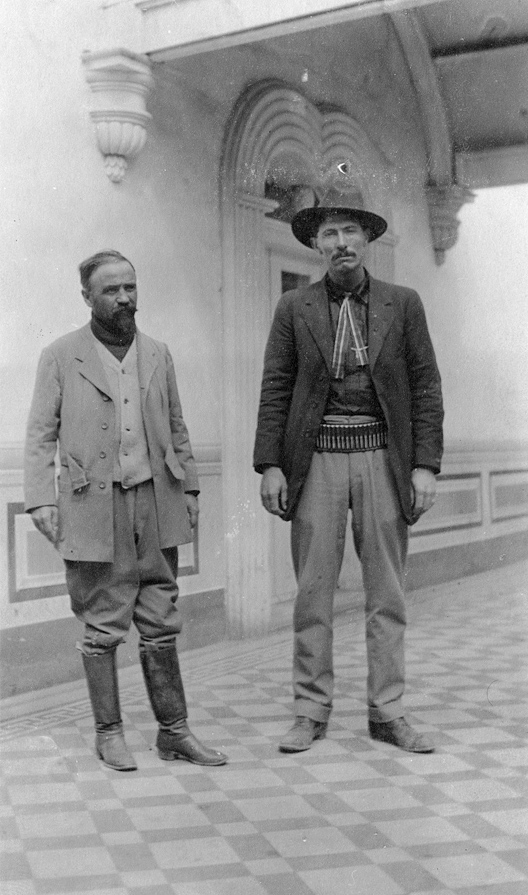
General Pascual Orozco (right), who defeated Diaz's Federal Army in Ciudad Juárez in 1911 and helped bring and civilian Francisco I. Madero (left) to the presidency in 1911. Orozco revolted against Madero in 1912.

Although revolutionary forces brought Francisco I. Madero to power, Madero dismissed them and retained the Federal Army that had just been defeated. The Federal Army suppressed a number of rebellions against Madero, following his election as president in November 1911, by revolutionary general Pascual Orozco. The army failed to suppress an on-going rebellion in the south, led by Zapata. Army generals increasingly saw the Madero regime as weak and ineffective, and intervened, staging a coup in February 1913. General Bernardo Reyes, General Félix Díaz, President Díaz's nephew, and General Victoriano Huerta forced Madero to resign and he was subsequently murdered. General Huerta became president of Mexico.

=== Formation of the Constitutionalist Army ===
The reaction to this was an uprising in the north of Mexico, with the Governor of Coahuila, Venustiano Carranza declaring the Huerta regime illegitimate and becoming the "First Chief" of the Constitutionalist Army. Two brilliant natural soldiers, Pancho Villa and Alvaro Obregón, rose to command armies that soundly defeated Huerta's Federal Army in 1914. Huerta resigned in July 1914, and Carranza insisted on the dissolution of the Federal Army. Zapata had continued guerrilla warfare in Morelos.

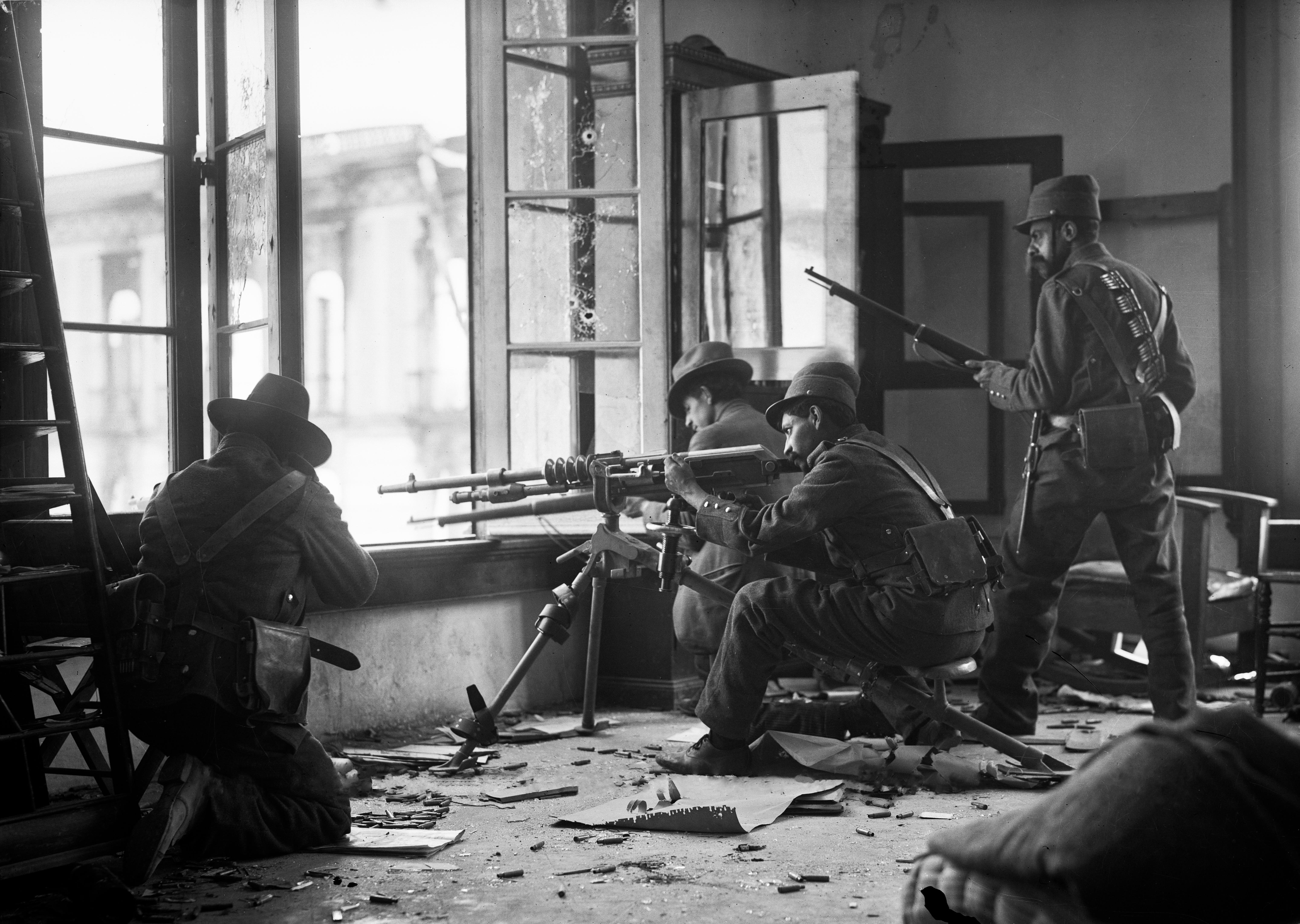
Urban warfare of rebel soldiers in the coup against the Madero government during the February 1913 Ten Tragic Days that brought General Victoriano Huerta.

With the forces of reaction defeated and the Federal Army gone, the revolutionary winners failed to reach agreement on how power would exercised. Civil war was the result, with the Constitutionalist Army loyal to Carranza and commanded by Obregón fought the army commanded by Villa, who had broken with Carranza. Villa had a loose alliance with Zapata, with each operating in their own military zones. Obregón defeated Villa in the Battle of Celaya in 1915, with his Villa's Northern Division shrinking to practically nothing. But both Villa and Zapata were able to wage guerrilla warfare against the Carranza regime.

=== Carranza and the revolutionary army, 1916-18 ===
Although Carranza held the capital, local revolutionary generals controlled a number of regions of Mexico, such as Saturnino Cedillo in San Luis Potosí, along with bands of bandits. Carranza's insistence on the complete dissolution of the Federal Army before revolutionary forces were organized sufficiently for a peace-keeping role meant that disorder prevailed. Revolutionary generals held more than half of the state governorships, with only half of those elected to the office. The other half seized power without confirmation by an election. Military men turned governors were not subordinate to Carranza's government, most notably General Plutarco Elías Calles of Sonora, who ignored Carranza's orders that he disagreed with. Mexico entered a period of what has been called "predatory militarism", where revolutionary strongmen were "venal, cruel, and corrupt", taking on the worst characteristics of the ousted Federal Army. Carranza was in no position to stop victorious generals from their abuses and had to entice them through bribes to remain loyal to him. Revolutionary generals closed ranks behind Carranza after Villa was defeated in 1915, and top generals Obregón, Benjamin G. Hill, Cándido Aguilar, Carranza's son-in-law, and Pablo González publicly supported Carranza and formed the Liberal Constitutionalist Party to ensure his election. Zapata remained in rebellion in Morelos, and Carranza ordered his assassination in 1919. Obregón had returned to his home state of Sonora, to await developments when elections were to be held in 1920.

The huge task of forging a regime that held effective power meant bringing the revolutionary armies of the Constitutionalist coalition and their officers under the control of the civilian central government. The armies had been created as regional entities, so that creating a national army met with resistance. The revolutionary armies were huge, with 200,000 soldiers and some 50,000 officers, of whom 500 claimed the rank of general. Carranza's Minister of War, General Obregón was tasked in 1916 with creating a national army. He had commanded the Army of the Northwest, bringing those forces under the control of the government, and persuading the commander of the Army of the Northeast, General González; the commander of the Army of the East; commander of the Army of the Northeast, Jacinto B. Treviño, and commander of the Army of the Southeast, Salvador Alvarado also to have their forces under the Ministry of War.

In the fall of 1916, Carranza called for a constituent convention to draft a new constitution. Carranza hadd envisioned a civilian government pursuing moderate reforms, the many revolutionary generals were unwilling to subordinate themselves to civilians, since they had won the revolution on the battlefield. Many generals were of modest social backgrounds, as opposed to Carranza, a wealthy landowner and professional politician, and the military men were ideologically more radical concerning the changes they envisioned for post-revolutionary Mexico. The new constitution in 1917 enshrined the Mexican government's power over land and natural resources as well as labor rights. It also included stringent measures against the Roman Catholic Church. Despite some articles appearing to be antimilitary, civilian attempts to abolish military courts judging cases dealing with discipline of soldiers and other matters, the military court was retained following the argument of General Francisco Múgica at the constituent convention. The constitution was more radical than Carranza and his civilian advisors wanted, but it was promulgated on 5 February 1917.

=== Role of the soldaderas ===
Soldaderas were women soldiers sent to combat among the men during the Mexican Revolution against the conservative Díaz regime to fight for freedoms. Many of these women led ordinary lives, but had taken arms during the time to seek better conditions and rights. Among the soldaderas Dolores Jiménez y Muro and Hermila Galindo are often considered heroines to Mexico today. Today, references to "La Adelita" are made as a symbol of pride among Mexican women. La Adelita was the title of one of the most famous corridos (folk songs) to come out of the Revolution, in which an unnamed revolutionary sang of his undying love for the soldadera Adelita.

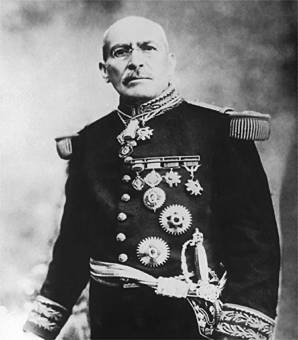
Federal Army General Victoriano, President of Mexico following the 1913 coup

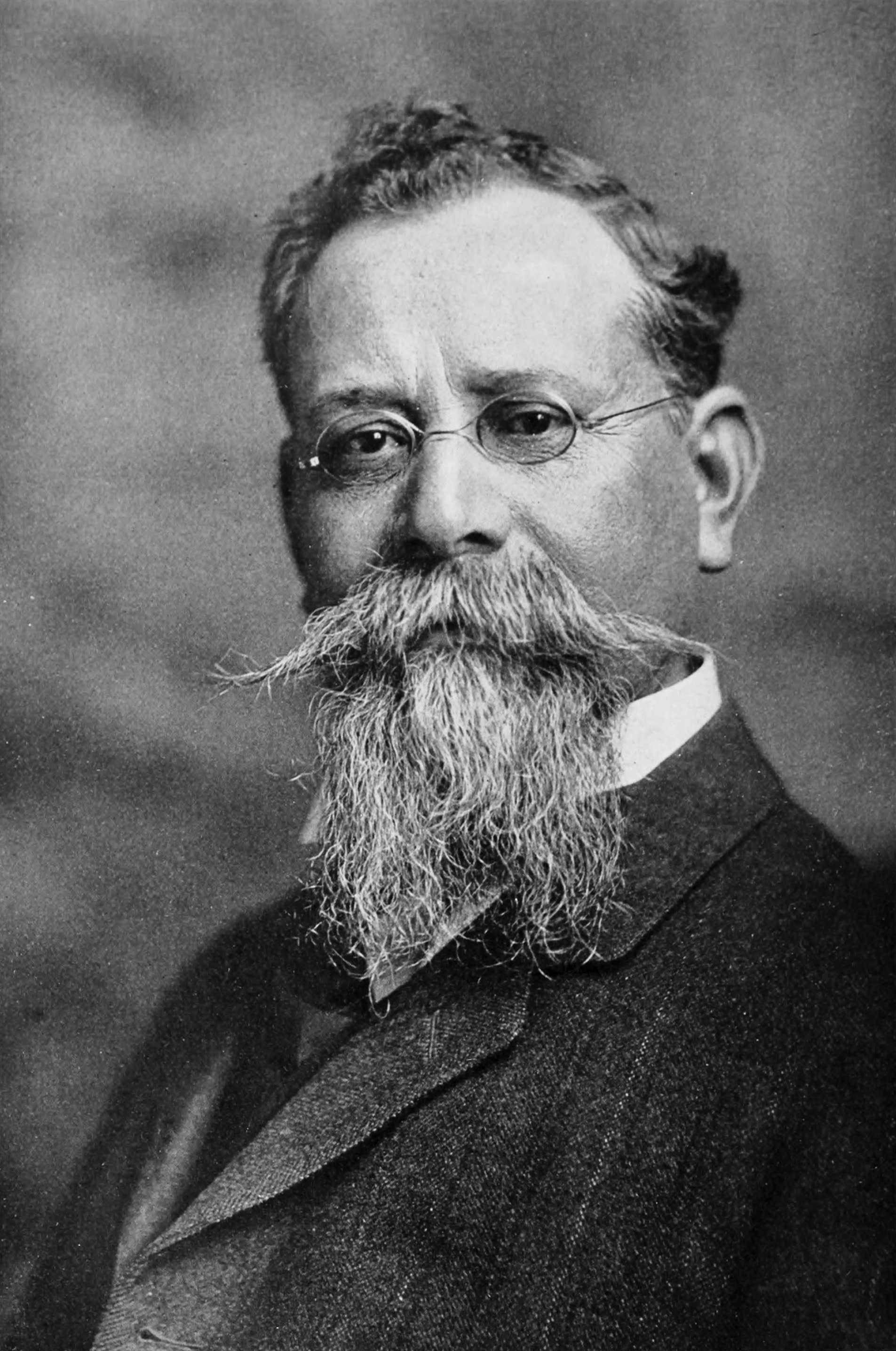
Venustiano Carranza, "First Chief" of the Constitutionalist Army

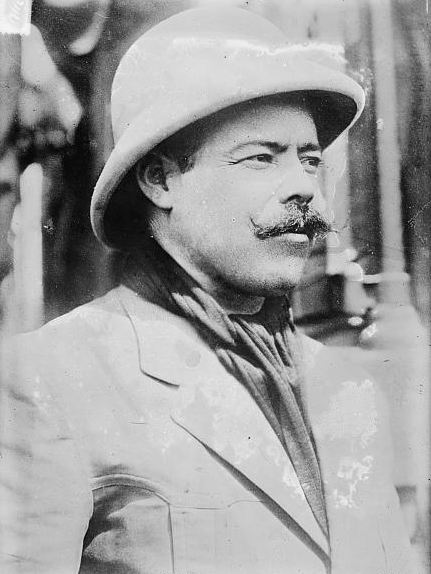
General Pancho Villa, Division of the North

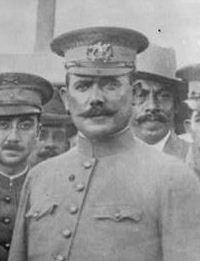
General Alvaro Obregón, Carranza's best general

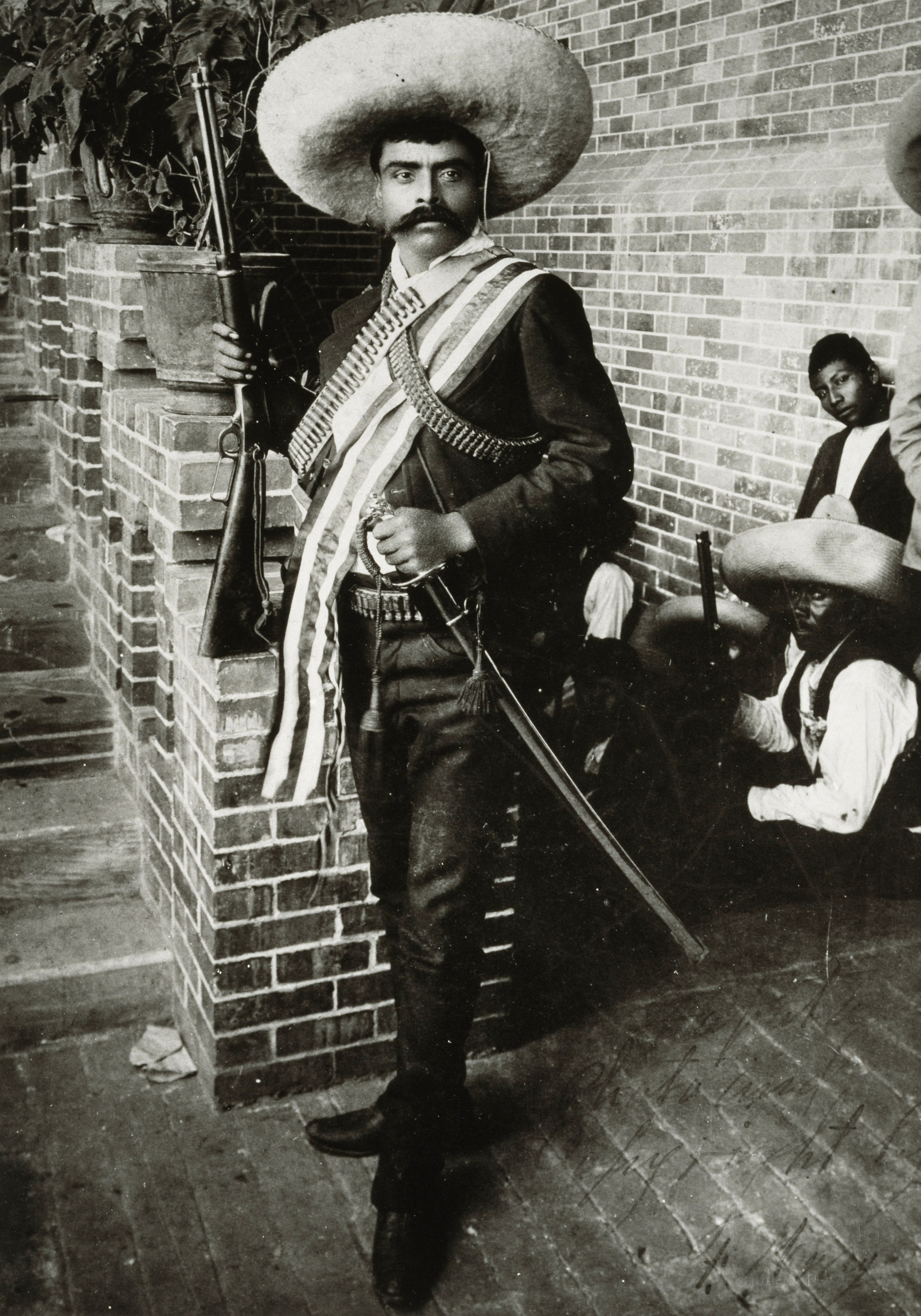
General Emiliano Zapata

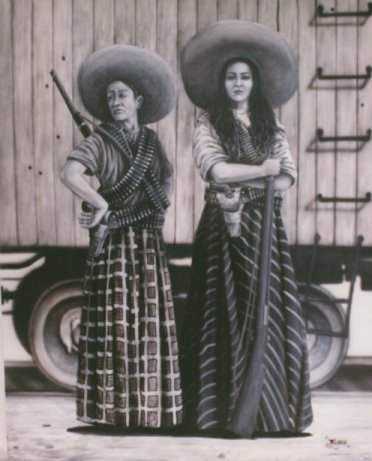
Soldaderas, women participants in the Mexican Revolution

=== World War I era ===
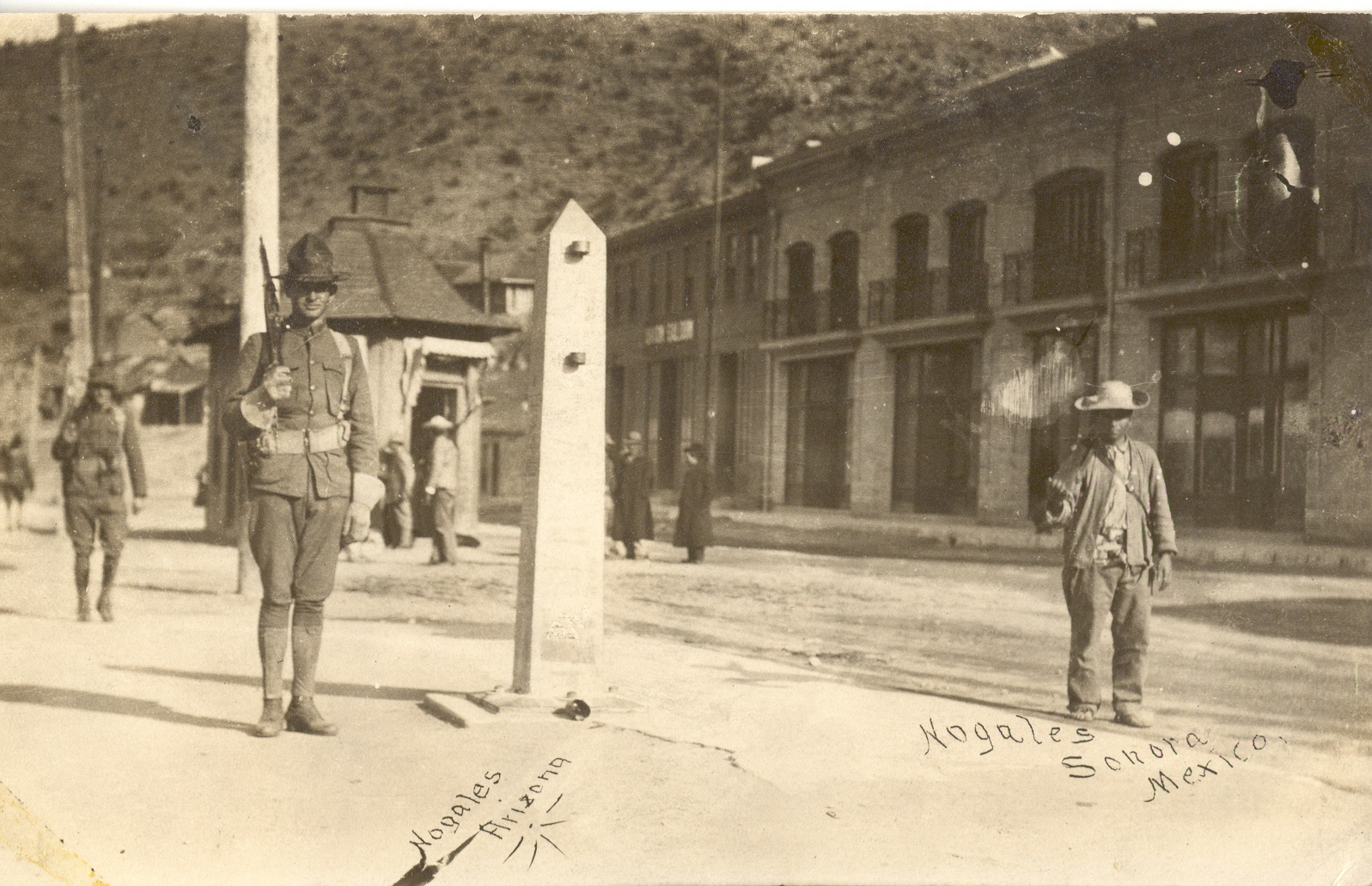
American and Mexican soldiers guarding the border in Ambos Nogales during the Mexican Revolution. The city was the site of two separate engagements in the Border War, a series of military engagements along the border during the Revolution.

With the Revolution still being fought, Mexico remained neutral during the First World War, 1914–1918. The period 1914–15 was the height of the civil war to oust the Huerta regime. Both Huerta and Carranza opposed the U.S. naval incursion into Mexico in 1914 Tampico Affair. The U.S. occupation of the port of Veracruz lasted seven months. The U.S. withdrew, leaving munitions that Carranza's Constitutionalist Army utilized against the Huerta regime. Following the break between Pancho Villa and Carranza's Constitutionalists, and Obregón's 1915 victory over Villa, Villa began waging guerrilla warfare against the U.S. in border raids, prompting the U.S. Army to invade northern Mexico, from March 1916 to February 1917. It was an unsuccessful attempt to capture him, ending when the U.S. entered World War I, but it raised tensions between the U.S. and the Carranza regime.

Germany hoped to capitalize on Carranza's fervent Mexican nationalism and anti-Americanism to aid its own geopolitical aims in World War I. Germany sent a coded communication to Mexico, promising the restoration of the region lost to the U.S. in the Mexican–American War (1846–1848). The Zimmermann Telegram was intercepted by the British. Carranza was attempting to consolidate his own regime and gain central control over revolutionary armies, so he held fast to Mexican neutrality in the larger conflict rather than risk an escalation with the U.S.

== Era of the Post Revolution, 1920–1946 ==
In 1920, Sonoran generals rebelled against Carranza, initiating a twenty-five year period of revolutionary generals in the presidency. Each one systematically curtailed the power of the military, bringing revolutionary armies and their generals under central government control. The period was also characterized by major unsuccessful rebellions, resulting in much loss of life, evidence that power struggles continued well after the Constitutionalists came to power.

=== The last successful military coup 1920 ===
Carranza could not run for re-election when his presidential term ended in 1920, but he expected to play a role in choosing his successor. Instead of endorsing his best and most loyal general, Alvaro Obregón, Carranza chose civilian Ignacio Bonillas to succeed him. Revolutionary generals in Sonora, Adolfo de la Huerta, Plutarco Elías Calles, and Alvaro Obregón promulgated the Plan of Agua Prieta and rose up against Carranza. Carranza fled the capital in a train, filled with his supporters and much of the gold in the treasury. Carranza died while trying to flee the country, and De la Huerta was installed as interim president, pending elections. Obregón was elected in 1920, serving a full four-year term.

=== Interim President and the military ===
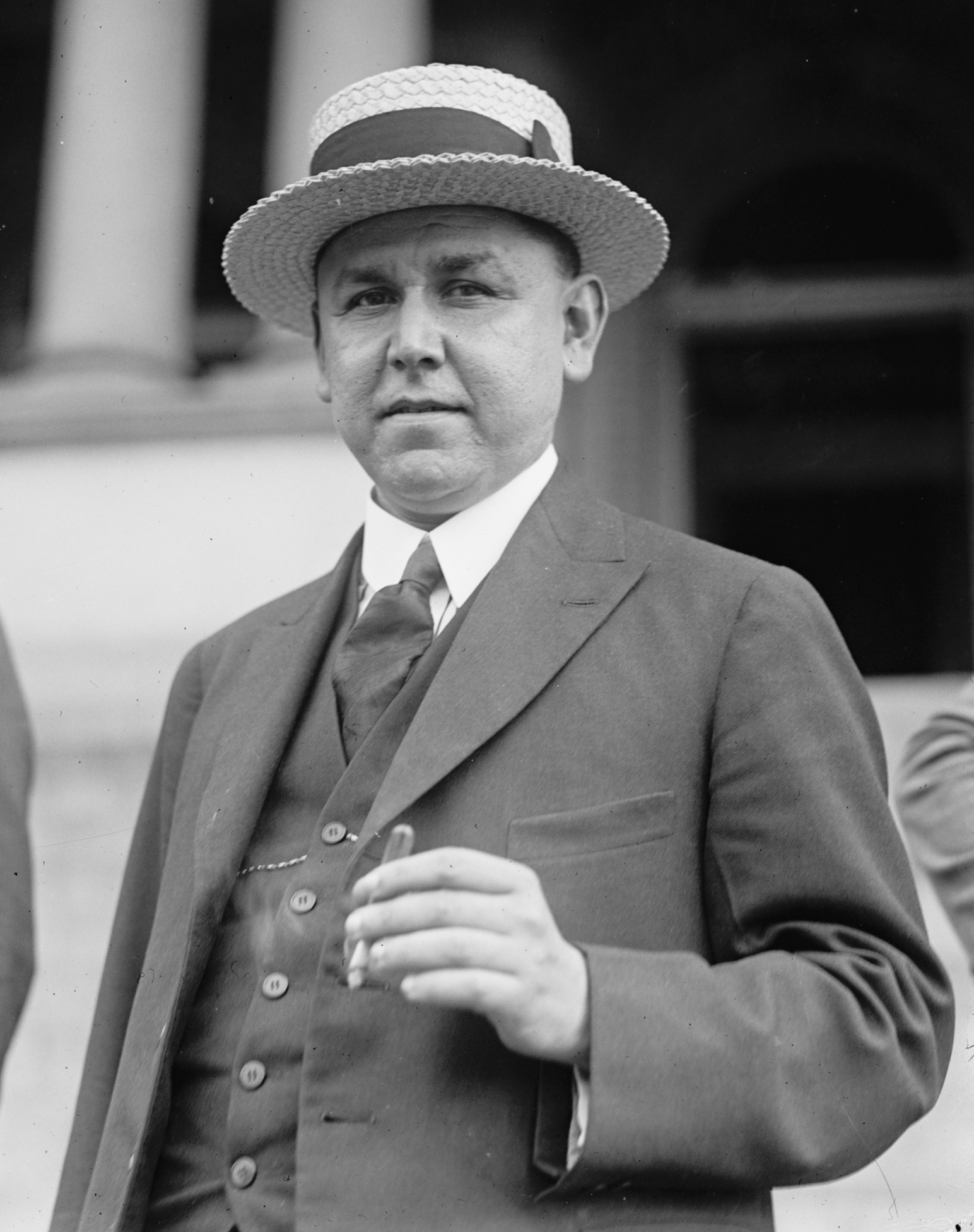
Adolfo de la Huerta

Adolfo de la Huerta held the presidency from May to December 1920. He took significant action regarding the military in this period. General González had ambitions to be president and entered Mexico City with 20,000 men in May. A larger army of Obregonistas forced González to withdraw. He was arrested and sentenced to death, but De la Huerta pardoned, allowing him to go into exile. De la Huerta then offered enticements to González's army to be loyal. Generals supporting Carranza purged and De la Huerta replaced military governors who Carranza loyalists. De la Huerta's most successful action was to grant amnesty to Pancho Villa, who had remained a threat, purchasing a landed estate for him in exchange for his laying down arms and generous cash payments.

=== Postrevolutionary military under Obregón, 1920-24 ===
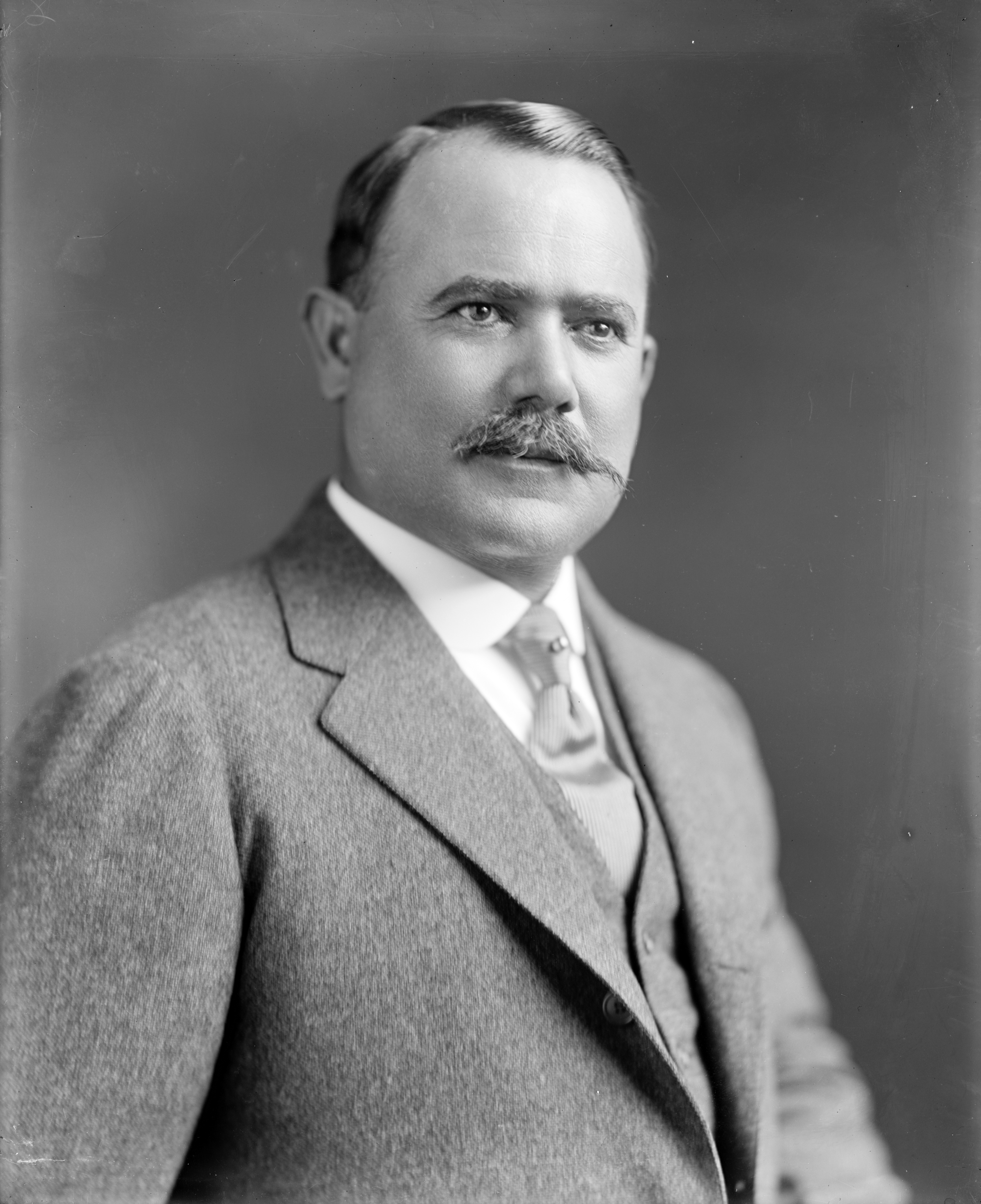
Alvaro Obregón

Obregón had started the process when he served as Carranza's Minister of War and continued it when he was elected President following the coup against Carranza. Obregón achieved a level of success by broadening the base of support for the central government, reining in local military strongmen by developing organized support of worker and peasant groups. Compared to Madero and Carranza, elite landowning civilians, Obregón had worked with his hands and during the Revolution found that he was a brilliant military leader and became a skilled politician. He began creating a power base that would enable him to reform the revolutionary military.

When Obregón chose Calles rather than De la Huerta as his successor, De la Huerta led an unsuccessful rebellion in 1923. De la Huerta had been an old comrade in arms, but the rebellion was serious, having significant army support to challenge Obregón and the central government's power. A hundred generals supported the rebel cause, including Cándido Aguilar and Salvador Alvarado, and official statistics showed that 2,500 officers (20%) rebelled as well as 23,000 troops (40%), joined by 24,000 civilians. Despite their numbers, the rebels were not unified or well-led. De la Huerta was nominally the head of the rebellion, but generals Fortunato Maycotte, Enrique Estrada, and Guadalupe Sánchez were the real leaders. On the government side, initially they had only 35,000 men, but workers and peasants volunteered for the cause. The disorganized rebellion was crushed, with Obregón, Calles, and Francisco Serrano prevailing. Many rebel generals were executed, including Alvarado, Estrada, Maycotte, Manuel Diéguez, Manuel García Vigil, and Rafael Buelna. Others went into exile. Officers loyal to Obregón were promoted. The rebellion was costly, with 7,000 deaths and 100 million pesos spent, but it importantly "sealed the supremacy of the military power of the central government over that of the outlying regions, spell[ing] the doom of regional caudillism. It also strengthened the labor and peasant counterpoises to the military."

=== Calles presidency and the military, 1924-28 ===
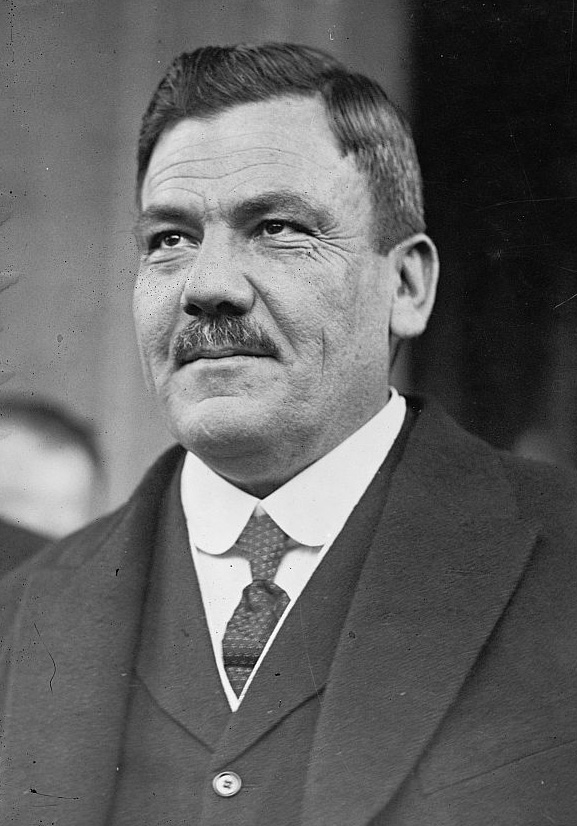
Gen. Plutarco Elías Calles

General Plutarco Elías Calles, as with Obregón and other revolutionary generals, became a military leader during the Revolution. He allied with organized labor movement led by Luis N. Morones. Calles sought to reorganize the army and downsize its huge proportion of the national budget, choosing General Joaquín Amaro as Minister of War. From a humble indigenous background, Amaro distinguished himself on the battlefield during the Revolution and then picked the right side in the coup against Carranza and in the failed De la Huerta rebellion. Amaro's tenure as Minister of War lasted six years, spanning the Calles presidency and the Maximato, after Obregón's assassination when Calles was not formally president but was the power behind the presidency. Amaro's orders were to reduce the military budget, challenged officers to justify their rank, reduced the number of regular troops, and mustered out irregular troops. He significantly reduced the military's budget from 36% of the national budget to 25%. He oversaw the revision of military laws, which codified practices for the postrevolutionary period. A general organic law laid out the mission of the military; the law of promotions created procedures for advancement in rank that did not rest on battlefield promotions or favoritism and ended automatic promotions. Promotions dependent on a space opening up and candidates passing competitive examinations, having professional training, and field experience. Retirement ages were specified for enlisted men and officers. Amaro also pursued creating a professional officer corps of younger men who had not risen to high rank during the Revolution. Young officers were sent abroad for military training, and then on their return to Mexico, to instill in them the idea of the military as a nonpolitical institution, subordinate to civil authority.

Implementing draconian changes to a large ad hoc fighting force with many distinguished and battle-hardened officers was no easy task. Calles followed practices of Porfirio Díaz and Alvaro Obregón, allowing generals to enrich themselves, and Calles himself accumulated a huge fortune. After Obregón left the presidency, he borrowed state funds that enabled him to expand his agricultural enterprises in Sonora. General Abelardo Rodríguez, who became president of Mexico during the Maximato, created a vast fortune as an entrepreneur in border towns, owning race tracks, casinos, and brothels and then diversified into real estate and financial services.

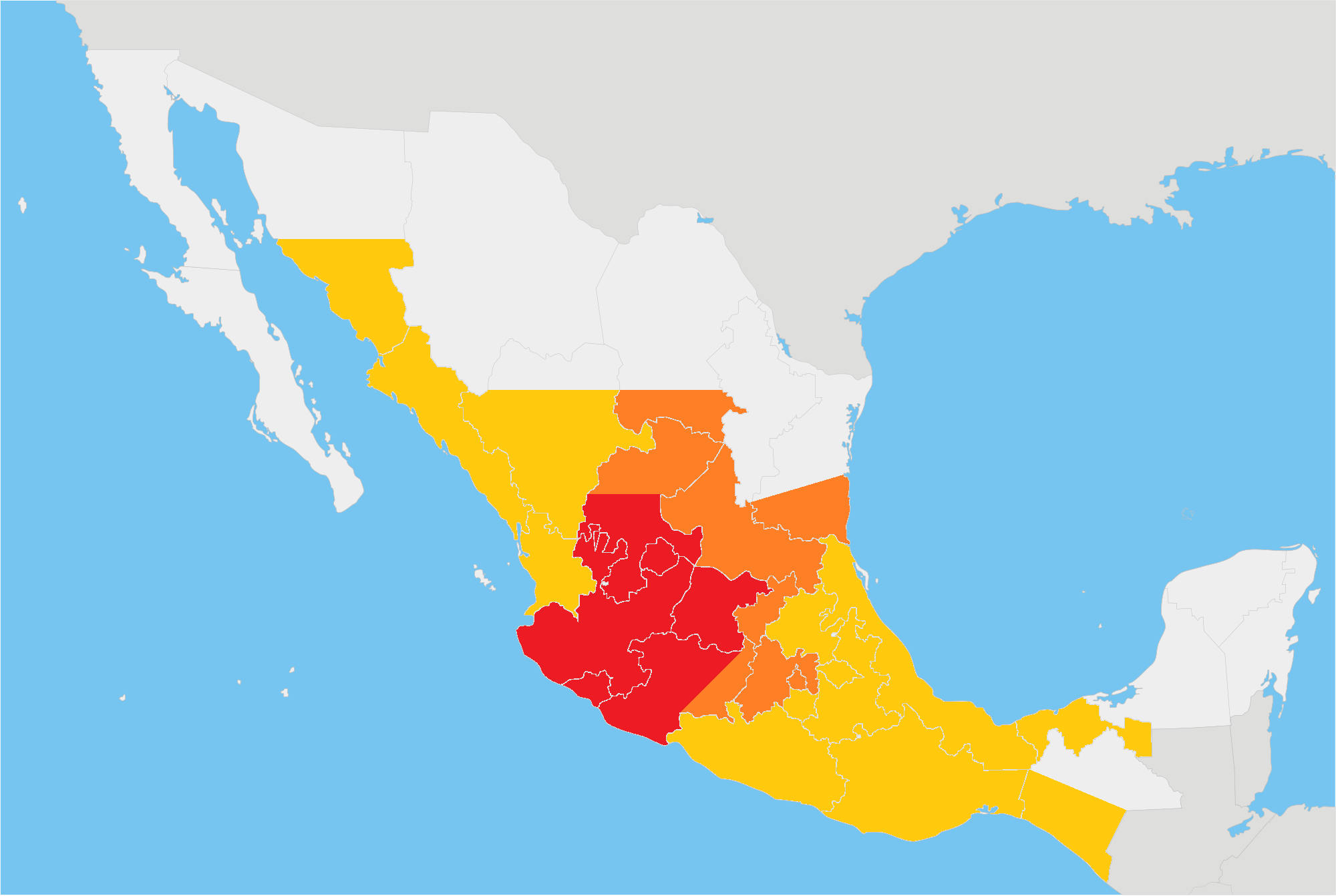
Map of the Cristero War, showing regions where Cristero outbreaks occurred. Large-scale outbreaks Moderate outbreaks Sporadic outbreaks

Calles is known for provoking an armed conflict with the Roman Catholic Church and its supporters, seeing them as a threat to the revolutionary regime. Using anticlerical provisions in the 1917 constitution, Calles mandated that secular education be implemented, the number of priests limited, and that they register with civilian authorities. The church hierarchy responded by ceasing saying mass, performing baptisms, marriages, and burials, and called for Catholics to resist. The Cristero War (also known as La Cristiada), was the last large-scale uprising in Mexico after the end of the military phase of the Mexican Revolution in 1920. There was serious fighting in the states of Michoacán, Guanajuato, Jalisco, and Colima. There are estimates of 100,000 Mexican army troops combating 50,000 Cristeros, with nearly 57,000 government troops killed and 30–50,000 Cristeros killed. An estimated 250,000, largely noncombatants, fled, many to the U.S. An experienced general in the Victoriano Huerta regime, Enrique Gorostieta led Cristeros. As President, Obregón was no friend of the Catholic Church, but he did not see a reason to provoke conflict with it when there were pressing issues for his presidency, such as securing U.S. diplomatic recognition and reining in regional revolutionary generals. But Calles underestimated the continuing power of religion in Mexico. Calles mobilized army troops to fight the Cristeros, which held their own against the federal armed forces. The rebellion was ended by diplomatic means, in large part due to the efforts of U.S. Ambassador Dwight Whitney Morrow, who negotiated an accord between the Catholic Church and the government, with the Church no longer backing armed rebellion. When General Manuel Avila Camacho became president of Mexico in 1940, he declared himself a Christian believer (soy creyente), and armed conflict over religion was at an end.

=== Maximato and the military ===
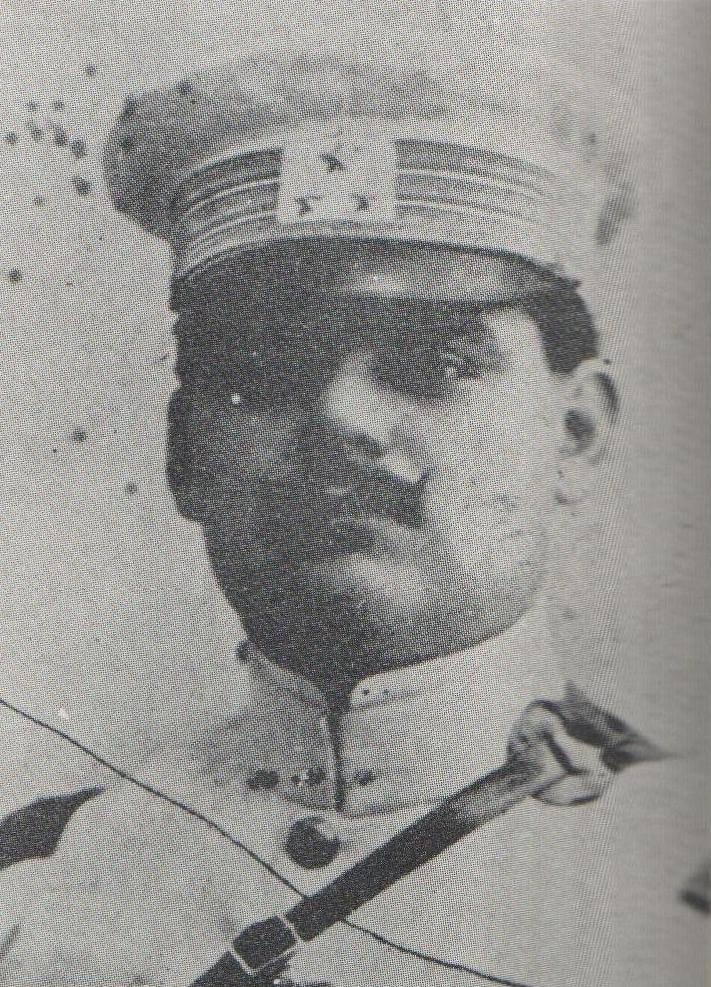
Gen. José Gonzalo Escobar led a failed rebellion in 1929

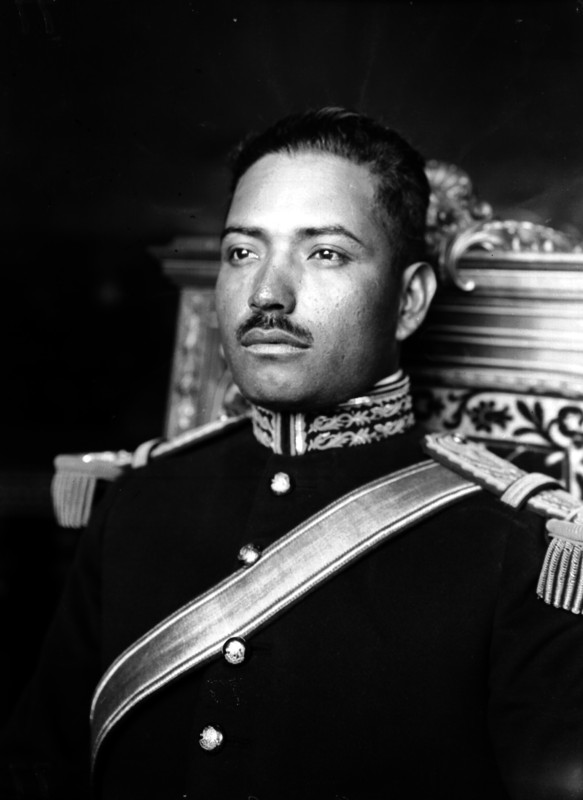
Gen. Joaquín Amaro, who implemented military reforms

Under pressure from Obregón, Calles pushed through a change to the constitution, allowing the re-election of a president if the terms were not continuous. This permitted Obregón to run again in the 1928 election. Generals Francisco Serrano and Arnulfo Gómez aspired to the presidency but, realizing that they could not win an election with the Calles government in charge of the election machinery, they rose in rebellion in 1927. Serrano, Gómez, and a number of their followers were captured and executed, and Obregón won the presidency in the 1928 election. Shortly after the win and before he took the oath of office, Obregón was assassinated by a Catholic fanatic before taking office. Calles could not directly serve as president, but he brokered a solution to presidential succession by founding the Partido Nacional Revolucionario (PNR), the precursor of the Institutional Revolutionary Party (PRI). Three men held the presidency during what would have been Obregón's term: Emilio Portes Gil (1928–30), Pascual Ortiz Rubio (1930-32); and Abelardo Rodríguez (1932–34), with the real power held by Calles, the jefe máximo (maximum chief). The period is now generally known as the Maximato. In March 1929, the Escobar Rebellion broke out, led by General José Gonzalo Escobar revolted against Calles and interim president Portes Gil. Five generals, Escobar (Coahuila), Jesús M. Aguirre (Veracruz), Francisco R. Manzo (Sonora), Francisco Urbalejo (Durango), and Marcelo Caraveo (Chihuahua), led some 17,000 troops in revolt. Francisco I. Madero's brother Raúl Madero joined the rebellion. Calles himself led troops against the rebels and Juan Andreu Almazán played an important role in crushing the rebellion. The U.S. supported the Mexican government in the conflict, allowing it to buy war materiel against the rebels.

General Amaro remained as Minister of War during the entire period, continuing to pursue the reform of the military that Calles had instigated when president. Presidential cabinets were replete with military men; they held governorships. "The military was supreme both in the government and the official party"(the PNR). The military held the upper hand in power, but the divisional generals understood that army was too large and put too much stress on the national budget, particularly during the Great Depression.

During the Maximato, Gen. Lázaro Cárdenas became Minister of War, replacing Amaro, he put soldiers to work building infrastructure, particularly paving roads and maintaining them. The push to professionalize the officer corps through education continued even in this era of economic difficulty. Cárdenas also created an office to monitor accounting and fiscal management, increased oversight of military justice to make sure regulations were followed and established an office of procurement for war materiel. These measures undercut the ways generals had been able to pad budgets and divert funds into their own pockets. The military in this period "became more professional and less political" during the Maximato, particularly for junior officers. Generals who participated in the Revolution continued to pursue politics.

=== Lázaro Cárdenas and the military ===
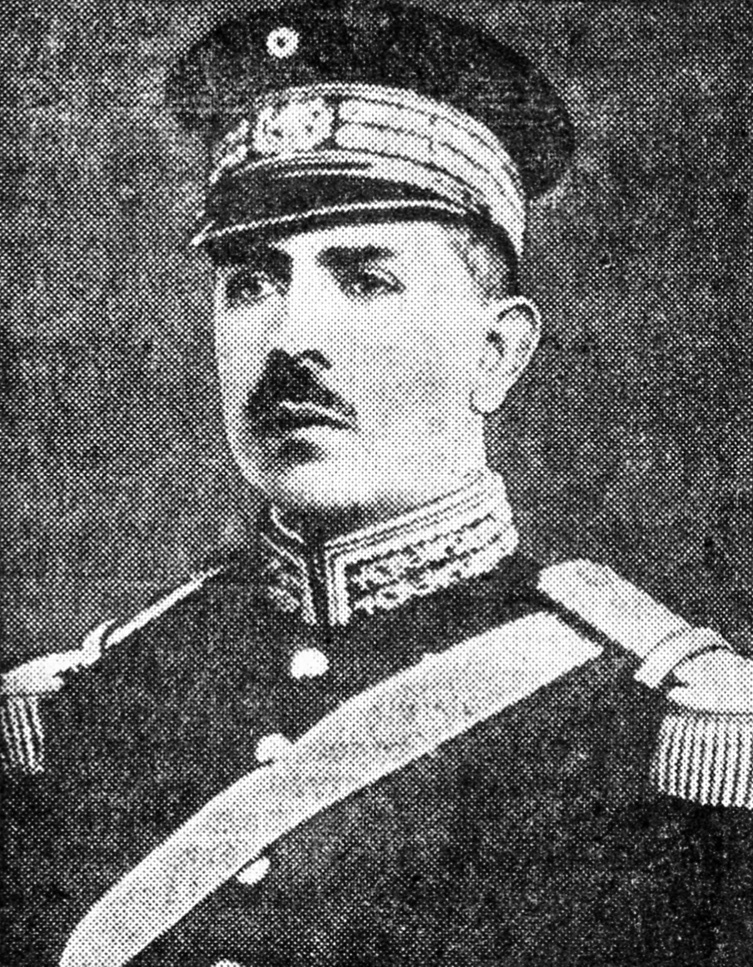
Gen. Lázaro Cárdenas

With the 1934 presidential election looming at the end of the six years that would have been Obregón's term as president, generals who were part of Calles's ruling group now began to show their presidential ambitions. Cárdenas resigned his post as Minister of War and ran for the presidency with the support of Saturnino Cedillo, the radical strongman of the state of San Luis Potosí and other generals. Unlike previous elections, that of Cárdenas did not provoke a military revolt by disgruntled generals. Cárdenas accepted the cabinet that Calles proposed, with only General Francisco Múgica being Cárdenas's choice. Calles had expected Cárdenas to become a puppet president like his immediate predecessors, but increasing he forged his own more independent and radical path of social reform. As a counterpoise to the army, Cárdenas proposed arming peasants and he was close to Marxist labor leader Vicente Lombardo Toledano. Cárdenas cracked down on sources of revenue for generals by closing casinos. Although revolutionary generals were increasingly concerned by Cárdenas's moves, he began winning over the junior officer corps by creating better schools, housing, and pensions. Calles was alarmed at Cárdenas's independence and seeming radicalism and attempted to rein him in. Cárdenas openly broke with Calles, counting on the support of some army generals, labor, and peasants. He removed Calles's men from the cabinet; he purged Calles's men from the PNR. In the end in April 1936, Cárdenas put Calles put him on an airplane to exile in the U.S. Consolidating his position further, Cárdenas invited back from exile those generals driven out by Obregón and Calles. These included participants in the 1923 Delahuertista rebellion. Also returning from exile were military participants in the 1929 Escobar rebellion, including Escobar himself. Porfirio Díaz, Junior, José María Maytorena, former governor of Sonora, and José Vasconcelos also returned. It was the end of dominance of the Sonoran revolutionary generals from Mexican politics.

Cárdenas continued the push for a smaller, professionalized army. The criterion for promotion became their performance on competitive examinations. Another way to reshape the top ranks was his reduction of time in service from 35 years to 25, forcing the retirement of many officers. He continued the trend of decreasing the size of the military budget as a percentage of national income, now down to 19% in 1938. He was determined to create a military whose soldiers were not separate from larger Mexican society. In a speech to cadets at the military academy he stated that "We should not think of ourselves as professional soldiers ... but rather as armed auxiliaries organized from the humble classes."

In 1936, Cárdenas reorganized the dominant party, renaming it the Partido Revolucionario Mexicano, with sectors of members by occupation. The Mexican National Army became of the four sectors, making it dependent on the PRM for patronage and privilege. Cárdenas implemented some radical policies, including land reform in Mexico as well as expropriation of foreign-owned petroleum in 1938.

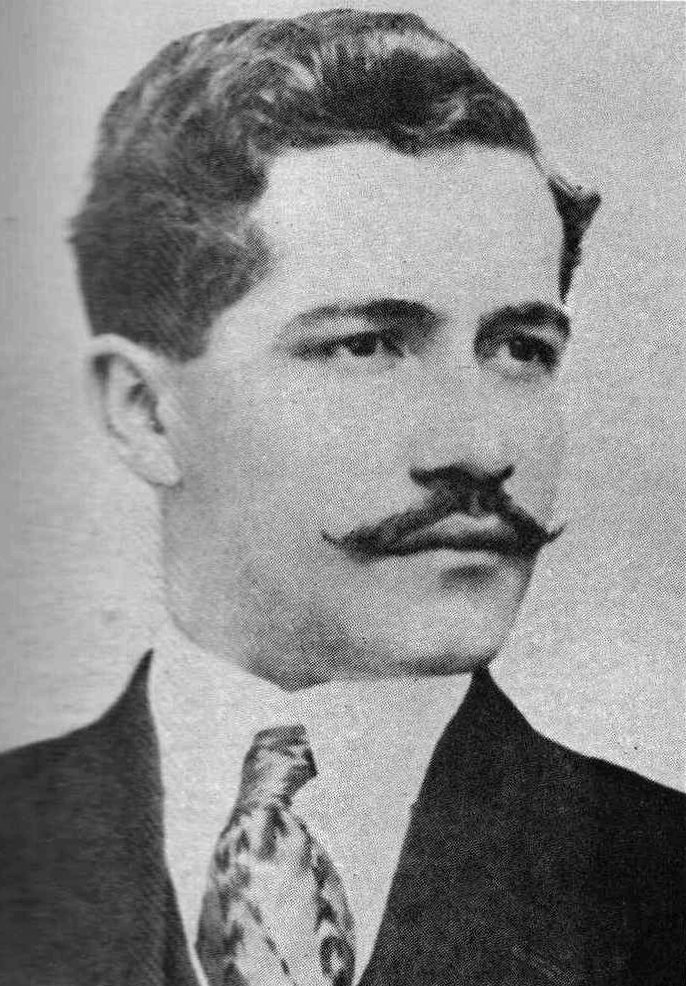
Gen. Juan Andreu Almazán

Cárdenas chose the moderate Manuel Avila Camacho, wryly known as the "unknown soldier," for his undistinguished revolutionary record. Retired revolutionary general Juan Andreu Almazán ran for the presidency, but in violent and likely fraudulent election, Avila Camacho was declared the winner. Almazán sought support from the U.S. and considered fomenting a rebellion, but in the end he attended Avila Camacho's inauguration. In 1946, the party chose Miguel Alemán Valdés, the son of a revolutionary general, to be its candidate. The PRM became the Institutional Revolutionary Party in 1946, no longer having a sector for the army. No military men sought office after the Miguel Henríquez Guzmán revolt in 1952. There were no more rebellions or attempted coups. The long history of the Mexican military as a political force was over. "The armed forces had been disciplined, unified, and subordinated to the civilian power... The consolidation of civilian supremacy over the armed forces in the 1950s established conditions for a particularly stable pattern of civilian-military relations."

=== World War II ===
Mexican boats attacked and sunk by German submarines during World War II.

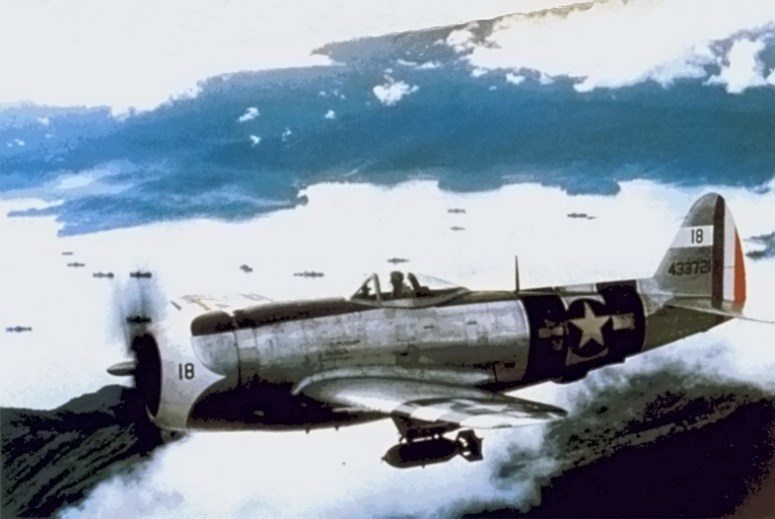
P-47D Thunderbolt of the Mexican 201st Fighter Squadron flying over the Philippines during World War II

Foreign relations with the United States and the United Kingdom reached a critical low in 1938 when Mexico seized and nationalized its oil industry, but this would quickly change with the outbreak of World War II. While still neutral, President and military general Manuel Ávila Camacho condemned the German invasions of 1939 and 1940 across Europe and extended its recognition to the governments in exile. Mexico broke relations with the Axis powers following its attack on the U.S. base at Pearl Harbor on 7 December 1941. Mexico extended rights of the U.S. Navy and participated in a Joint Defense Commission with the U.S. In May 1942 German U-boats torpedoed and sank two Mexican oil tankers in the Gulf: the Potrero del Llano and the Faja de Oro. Manuel Ávila Camacho called Congress for an extraordinary session and Mexico officially declared war on the Axis powers on 22 May 1942. Former President Lázaro Cárdenas (1934–40) served the Avila Camacho administration as Minister of Defense. Cárdenas was the key negotiator with the U.S. military about "radar surveillance, landing rights, naval patrols, and chains of command." The Mexican population was indifferent or hostile to the war. The institution of conscription led to violent protests, prompting the Mexican government to exempt conscripts from service overseas, helping to quell the civil unrest. However, Mexican citizens living in the United States were drafted in the U.S. Army, sustaining a high casualty rate.

The Mexican airforce contributed with the 201 Squadron, also known as the Aztec Eagles. This group comprised more than 300 volunteers who trained in the United States and fought against Imperial Japan in the Pacific theatre. The Mexican 201 Fighter Squadron joined the 5th Air Force unit of the United States during the liberation of the Philippines; where Australian, Filipino and more American personnel also participated on the ground and in the sea.

Military participation was very limited in the end, but Mexico proved a key ally to sustain the domestic economy and industry of the United States during war. The Bracero Program (1942-1964) between the two countries sought to supply American plantations and factories with Mexican workers. The Bracero Program is the largest foreign worker program in U.S. history, and the subsequent pattern of mass migration of millions of Mexicans to the United States can be traced back to this policy. Around 5 million worker visas were granted to fill up vacancies in 24 U.S. states.

Although most countries in the Western Hemisphere eventually entered the war on the Allies' side, Mexico and Brazil were the only Latin American nations that sent troops to fight overseas. The cooperation of Mexico and the United States in World War II helped bring about reconciliation between the two countries at the leadership level.

== Post World War II ==
=== 1994 Zapatista Rebellion in Chiapas ===
One recent event in the military history of Mexico is that of the Zapatista Army of National Liberation, which is an armed rebel group that claims to work to promote the rights of the country's indigenous peoples. The Zapatistas had the initial goal of overthrowing the federal government. Short armed clashes in Chiapas ended two weeks after the uprising and there have been no full-scale confrontations ever since. The federal government instead pursued a policy of low-intensity warfare with para-military groups in an attempt to control the rebellion, while the Zapatistas developed a media campaign through numerous newspaper comunicados and over time a set of six "Declarations of the Lacandonian Jungle", with no further military or terrorist actions on their part. A strong international Internet presence has prompted the adherence to the movement of numerous leftist international groups.

President Ernesto Zedillo (1994–2000) refused most of the demands of the rebels.

=== Hurricane Katrina, 2005 ===
In September 2005 Mexican army convoys traveled to the U.S. to help in the Hurricane Katrina relief effort. Mexican army convoys and a navy ship laden with food, supplies and specialists traveled to the United States including military specialists, doctors, nurses and engineers carrying water treatment plants, mobile kitchens, food and blankets. The convoy represents the first Mexican military unit to operate on U.S. soil since 1846, when Mexican troops briefly marched into Texas, which had separated from Mexico and joined the United States. All of the convoy's participants were unarmed.

=== Mexican Dirty War ===
The Mexican Dirty War began in 1964 and ended in 1982. It was produced by the Mexican governments who killed, tortured, and disappeared dissidents and political opponents. It involved the Institutional Revolutionary Party (PRI) which was supported by the US government, left-wing students, and Guerrilla groups. The authoritarian party that ruled the country for 71 years before being removed in 2000. The presidencies that took place during the time were of Gustavo Diaz Ordaz (1964-1970), Luis Echeverria (1970-1976) and Jose Lopez Portillo (1976-1982).

With the release of “Historical Report to the Mexican Society” Mexico accepted full responsibility for starting a dirty war against leftist guerrillas, university students, and activists. The report included declassified government records, photographs, and details about individuals who were killed under the rule of the PRI. Also, Echeverria is known as," the master of illusion, the magician of deceit." According to prosecutor Carrillo who tried to charge him. He explains how their regime chose violence to maintain the status quo when given the choices between repression and negotiation, political stasis, or transformation.

==== Events ====
It all began in 1960, when Echeverría wanted to take over the Guerrero region with his "dirty war tactics" that involved his desire to tamp down military dissatisfaction by giving the army and the security forces the green light to attack the left. As the local people grew agitated with the government over use of power, the state enacted suppression acts on Guerrero people to keep the numerous political reform movements quiet. As citizens became more determined to speak out against the government, the PRI increased its terror tactics in the region. With the state’s lengthy coast and rugged but fertile inland mountains, as well as its high poverty rates, made it ideal for drug production and trafficking. Which also increased rates of violence in the state. The tactics continued being done to keep the people under its control, the constant barrage of violence also prompted many guerrillas to consider joining the PRI.

In May 1974, the Party of the Poor (PDLP) kidnapped senator Rubén Figueroa Figueroa, a prominent PRI leader. Echeverría's security apparatus took part in a manhunt, to secure a staged rescue of the senator. Reason being, Pablo Cabanas leader of the (PDLP) had a secret payout which was part of his demand for Figueroa's liberation. The army began to start closing in on Cabanas after the successful capture of Senator Figueroa. With the governments eyes on the (PDLP) they seized this was the best opportunity to capture and or kill their leader. Cabanas was later found dead in a shoot-out with soldiers in December 1974.

The protests of 1968 were unprecedented in Mexico and saw hundreds of thousands take to the streets demanding an end to political repression and the freeing of political prisoners. The violent governmental response also was unmatched and signaled the beginning of Mexico 's dirty war against political opponents. Which culminated in the Tlatelolco massacre on October 2, 1968, a student rally in Mexico City turned sideways. With the death toll still in question to this day some estimated the toll in the thousands, but most sources report the toll between 200 and 300 student deaths. The shocking part was the government trying to cover up the massacre by claiming that extremists and communists' agitators initiated the violence. With many eyewitnesses pointing the finger at the President’s security forces who had entered the plaza fully armed with weapons and backed up by armored vehicles. Another massacre took place in Corpus Christi, which also involved student demonstrators in Mexico City on June 10, 1971. During this time, there were several unconnected groups fighting against the government.

During the war, there were an estimated 1,200 disappearances without a trace. Mexico, pressured into joining Operation Intercept (1969) and Operation Condor (1975). Operation Intercept was launched along the Mexico border to halt the flow of marijuana, heroin, and dangerous drugs. Operation Condor was the first war on drugs in Mexican history, its main purpose was to wipe out the actors involved in the illegal drug industry. The judicial investigation into state crimes against political movements did not begin until the end of the 71-year-long PRI regime and the election of Vicente Fox in 2000, when the Special Prosecutor's Office for Social and Political Movements of the Past was established (FEMOSPP). Despite realigning much about the conflict's history the (FEMOSPP) has been unable to complete prosecutions against their main perpetrators of the Dirty War.

==== Torture ====
Torture was one of many tools used by the PRI group to keep the numerous guerrilla groups and political dissidents under control. Torture was used by the Mexican state to obtain information about attacks and plans from captured rebels and guerrillas. Torture would be done at any number of clandestine detention centers, where guerrillas would be sent before being transferred to a legal prison, to keep the state's activities hidden from outside sources. Hundreds of people tied to the left were illegally detained, tortured and disappeared at the hands of Mexican security forces. The military detained Pablo Cabañas, Lucio’s younger brother, in January 1972. As he stated," my life changed completely." As the soldiers questions him about his brother Lucio's whereabouts, the soldiers chose violence to get him talking they, "slapped us (prisoners) across the face with a club, kicked, electric shocks all over the body, inside the underpants, almost naked, stuck us in a barrel of cold water, submerged our heads, hands and feet tied up, thrown on the floor to be kicked wherever we fell.” After almost spending six years in prison Pablo was released in 1977.

Published on "The National Security Archive", a research group at George Washington University, posted the document on their Web site. An early version of the report was leaked in February to the Mexican press against the wishes of Fox and Carrillo, who felt it was biased against the military and left out important facts. With the government being pressured they issued out the much-awaited final draft. The report included the names of 645 people who disappeared by the state security apparatus, along with the circumstances under which some of them vanished. It also includes the names of 99 people who were victims of extrajudicial executions and more than 2,141 cases of torture.

==== Aftermath ====
While Mexico's Dirty War has been over for several years, little is known about the number of victims the war claimed due to its elusive nature throughout its duration. Part of the reason was people getting fed lies and not hearing the truth and leaving many victims' families without closure. NGOs has conducted some local investigations since the early 2000s, providing insight into the tactics and dynamics of the war and the scale of crimes. In one case, the "Association of Relatives of Victims of Disappearance, Detention, and Human Rights Violations in Mexico" (AFADEM) documented over 470 disappearances at the hands of state forces in the municipality of Atoyac during the 1970s. Despite evidence of numerous human rights violations, ex-President Echeverria and several other PRI officials had their cases dismissed and were released. The government's failure to address these past problems has caused tension in Mexico at times, as citizens have grown distrustful of a state that does not address the old regime and its reign of terror.

On March 1, 2019, the President of Mexico, Andres Manuel Lopez Obrador, released the official archives of the Federal Security Directorate which showed how'd intelligence agencies targeted activists and opposition groups during the country's "Dirty War." Lopez Obrador stated," we lived for decades under an authoritarian regime that limited freedoms and persecuted those who struggled for social change." Furthermore, he added an official apology on behalf of the Mexican State to victims of repression and said surviving perpetrators of the repression will face legal action, and that surviving victims will be able to see compensation under the law.

=== Mexican Drug War ===
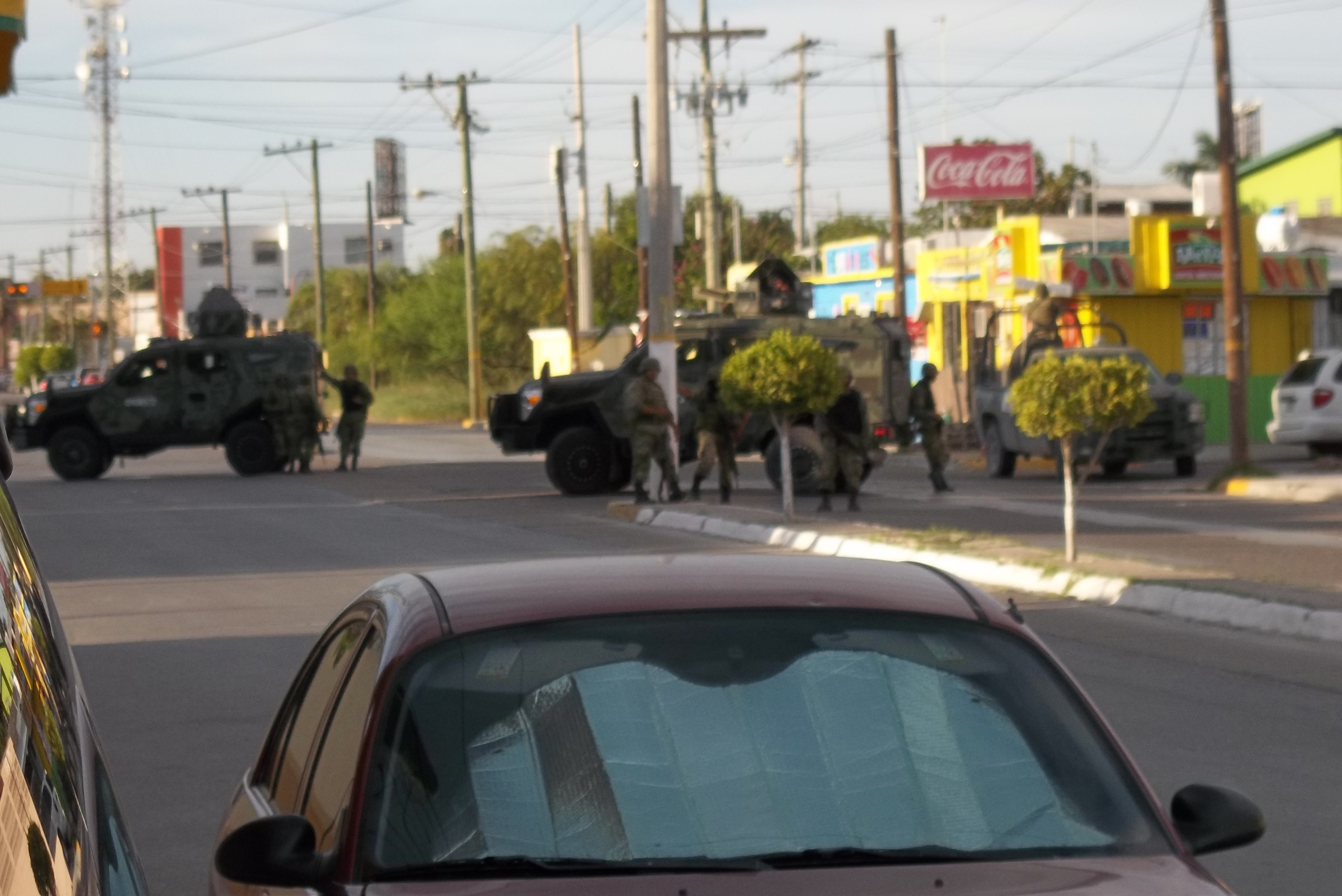
Mexican soldiers raid a house reportedly owned by the Gulf Cartel in 2012.

The Mexican military has participated in efforts against drug trafficking. The Operaciones contra el narcotrafico (Operations against drug trafficking), for example, describes its purpose in regards to "the performance of the Mexican Army and Air Force in the permanent campaign against the drug trafficking is sustained properly in the faculties that the Executive of the Nation grants to him, the 89 Art. Fracc. VI of the Constitution of the Mexican United States, when indicating that it is faculty of the President of the Republic to have the totality of the permanent Armed Forces, that is of the terrestrial Army, Navy military and the Air Force for the inner and outer security of the federation."

In 1892 the Federal Law started making changes and brought in four new elite special forces into Mexico. While having to reorganize police forces five times the very tempting bribery to pay off police forces had come to an end. Drug wholesales had sky rocketed in the early (2000s) jumping from $13.6 to $49.4 billion. With that happening on June (2008) legislation was passed and Mexico was granted $1.6 billion in efforts to upgrade the National Justice System and stop the war on drugs.

=== U.N. Peacekeeping, 2014 ===
Mexico has deployed troops for the United Nations peacekeeping efforts.

=== Border security ===
The government of Andrés Manuel López Obrador established the Mexican National Guard in 2019, which has been involved with border security.

== Timeline ==
- 1519: Hernán Cortés lands at Veracruz. In 1521 Cortés and his indigenous allies conquer Tenochtitlán, the Aztec capital.
- 1808: Napoleon dethrones the Spanish king, Charles IV, stimulating political unrest throughout Spain's empire.
- 1810–c. 1821: During wars of independence that pit Mexicans against one another as well as the forces of Spain, over 12 percent of the Mexican population dies. Independence is achieved under the 1821 Plan of Iguala, which promises equality for citizens and preserves the privileges of the Catholic Church.
- 1835: Rebels seeking independence for Texas fight the regular army at the Alamo. In 1836 the Texas Republic becomes independent.
- 1837–1841: Revolts favoring federalism over the centralizing constitution imposed by Antonio López de Santa Anna in 1836 occur in much of Mexico.
- 1845: The United States annexes Texas.
- 1846–1848: Mexican–American War. In the resulting Treaty of Guadalupe Hidalgo, Mexico recognizes the loss of Texas and cedes parts or all of what are now the U.S. states of New Mexico, Arizona, Utah, Colorado, Nevada, and California to the United States.
- 1847: The start of the Caste War of Yucatan.
- 1854: Mexico sells 77,700 km^{2} (nearly 30,000 square miles) of northern Sonora and Chihuahua to the United States in the Gadsden Purchase.
- 1854–1861: Benito Juárez and other liberals overthrow Santa Anna (Revolution of Ayutla). The liberal reforms they inaugurate encourage division of Indian and church lands into private holdings, subject clergy and military to regular courts, and establish religious freedom.
- 1857: Constitution re-establishes a federal republic and, moving beyond the Constitution of 1824, guarantees the individual rights of free speech, assembly, and press. In 1858–1861 supporters and opponents of the reforms fight the War of the Reform, which ends in liberal victory.
- 1862–1867: The French emperor Napoleon III, in alliance with conservative and proclerical Mexicans, installs Maximilian of Habsburg as emperor of Mexico. On May 5, 1862, loyalist troops defeat Napoleon III's troops at Puebla. Porfirio Díaz, maintains the liberal economic policies and secularization achieved under Juárez and encourages foreign investment.
- 1901: End of Caste War of Yucatán.
- 1910–11: Challenge of multiple revolutionary groups to the Díaz regime and the Federal Army; victory of Maderistas Pascual Orozco and Pancho Villa in Ciudad Juárez. Madero demobilizes the revolutionary forces that brought him to power and retains the Federal Army.
- 1911-13: Federal Army suppresses revolts against the Madero regime.
- 1913-14: Military coup against Madero. Revolutionary forces forming to oppose Victoriano Huerta's regime.
- 1914: Constitutionalist Army defeats Huerta's Federal Army, which is then dissolved. Villa breaks with Carranza, loosely allies with Zapata.
- 1915: Civil war. Obregón defeats Villa in 1915, Constitutionalists take power.
- 1916: Villa's attacks on border towns. United States President Woodrow Wilson orders Gen. John Pershing to capture guerrilla leader Pancho Villa after Villa's attack on Columbus, New Mexico. For nine months 4,000 American troops search in vain for Villa.
- 1917: The Constitution of 1917 maintains republican and liberal features of the 1824 and 1857 constitutions but also guarantees social rights such as a living wage. It nationalizes mineral resources and prohibits foreign businessmen from appealing to their home governments to protect their property. Amended many times, this constitution remains in force.
- 1923: Unsuccessful revolt by Adolfo de la Huerta against Obregón and Calles.
- 1926-29: Conflict over the 1917 Constitution's provisions for separation of church and state leads to nationalization of church property and armed rebellion, which the government suppresses. This period is known as the Cristero War.
- 1928: Unsuccessful revolt by Generals Gómez and Serrano.
- 1929: Escobar Rebellion, unsuccessful revolt by a number of generals against Plutarco Elías Calles.
- 1942: Mexico enters World War II, on the side of the Allied Powers.
- 1994: The Zapatista rebellion in Chiapas protests the PRI's dominance of political power and the government's indifference to the fate of peasants and indigenous peoples.

== See also ==
- History of Mexico
- List of wars involving Mexico
- Mexican Armed Forces
- Mexican Dirty War
- Mexican drug war
- Mexican Indian Wars
- Mexican Revolution
- Mexican National Guard
- Rurales
