= Barrere =

Barrere or Barrère is a French surname. Notable people with the surname include:

- Adrien Barrère (1874–1931), French visual artist
- Camille Barrère (1851–1940), French diplomat
- Georges Barrère (1876–1944), French flutist
- Grégoire Barrère (born 1994), French tennis player
- Granville Barrere (1829–1889), American politician and nephew of Nelson Barrere
- Marcel Barrére (1920–1996), French rocket scientist
- Nelson Barrere (1808–1883), American politician and uncle of Granville Barrere
- Paul Barrere (1948–2019), American rock musician
- Pierre Barrère (1690–1755), French naturalist

== See also ==
- Barere
- Barrera
