= USS Symbol =

Minesweeper of the United States Navy

History

United States
- Name: USS Symbol (AM-123)
- Builder: Savannah Machinery and Foundry Co., Savannah, Georgia
- Laid down: 18 November 1941
- Launched: 2 July 1942
- Commissioned: 10 December 1942
- Decommissioned: 31 May 1946
- Recommissioned: 28 October 1950
- Decommissioned: 27 July 1956
- Stricken: 1 July 1972
- Honours and awards: 5 battle stars (World War II); 2 battle stars (Korea)
- Fate: Sold to Mexico, 19 September 1972

Mexico
- Name: ARM Guillermo Prieto (C71)
- Namesake: Guillermo Prieto
- Acquired: 19 September 1972
- Reclassified: G02
- Renamed: ARM Juan de la Barrera (P102), 1993
- Namesake: Juan de la Barrera
- Status: in active service, as of 2007

General characteristics
- Class & type: Auk-class minesweeper
- Displacement: 890 long tons (904 t)
- Length: 221 ft 3 in (67.44 m)
- Beam: 32 ft (9.8 m)
- Draft: 10 ft 9 in (3.28 m)
- Speed: 18 knots (33 km/h; 21 mph)
- Complement: 100 officers and enlisted
- Armament: 1 × 3"/50 caliber gun; 2 × 40 mm guns; 2 × 20 mm guns; 2 × Depth charge tracks

USS Symbol (AM-123) was an Auk-class minesweeper acquired by the United States Navy for the dangerous task of removing mines from minefields laid in the water to prevent ships from passing.

Symbol was laid down on 18 November 1941 by the Savannah Machinery and Foundry Co., Savannah, Georgia; launched on 2 July 1942; sponsored by Mrs. M. L. Mingledorf; and commissioned on 10 December 1942.

== Atlantic Ocean operations ==
Symbol sailed to Charleston, South Carolina, to complete outfitting from 6 to 26 January 1943 and then sailed to Key West, Florida, to hold her shakedown cruise which ended at Norfolk, Virginia, on 9 February. On the 17th, she escorted Monadnock (ACM-10) to Boston, Massachusetts, and returned to Norfolk, Virginia. The minesweeper stood out of Norfolk on 20 March en route to Iceland for duty. She arrived at Reykjavík on the 31st and operated there until 22 July when she got underway to return to Norfolk. She remained at Norfolk from 30 July to mid-August.

Symbol was assigned to escort convoy UGS-15 to North Africa, and it sortied on 16 August. The convoy arrived at Oran, Algeria, on 3 September. Two days later, the minesweeper was assigned to Task Force (TF) 81 for the pre-invasion sweeps of Salerno. She arrived off the beaches on 8 September and streamed her sweep gear at 2245 hours to clear the inshore transport area. The ship swept mines during the day and served as antisubmarine and "E-boat" patrol at night. There was a heavy air attack on the 16th, and Symbol's guns splashed two German Focke-Wulf aircraft. The same day, she departed with a convoy for Palermo, Sicily, and returned on the 19th. On 21 September she went to the aid of SS William W. Gerhard, which had either hit a mine or been torpedoed, and took aboard 124 survivors. She departed with a convoy for Bizerte on the 25th and returned with another on 1 October and remained for four days before returning to Bizerte.

Symbol shuttled between North African and Italian ports until 8 January 1944 when she arrived at Naples, Italy, with a convoy from Oran. She was attached to the sweeper group for Operation Shingle, the landing of Allied forces 60 miles behind the German lines in the Anzio-Nettuno area. The group sortied on the 21st and arrived at the assault area where Symbol began sweeping the transport area for their arrival. She swept mines during the day and performed patrol duty at night. On the 26th, she shot down a German aircraft during an air raid. She departed the operating zone on 13 February with a convoy for Naples. Symbol shuttled convoys between Africa and Italy for the next four months with assignments to Anzio in between. She was at Anzio sweeping and patrolling from 7 to 15 March; 15 to 18 April; 24 to 31 May; and 1 to 10 June. On the 10th, a German fighter-bomber attacked, dropping an anti-personnel bomb which exploded 50 yards off the starboard quarter just before hitting the water. The ship had four killed, 25 injured, and approximately 125 holes, some one and one-half inches long, in her hull and superstructure. She returned to Naples for repairs and held training exercises in July.

Symbol departed Naples, Italy, on 12 August as a convoy escort for ships destined to participate in Operation Dragoon, the invasion of southern France. As the fleet closed the landing beaches, the minesweepers were detached to begin clearing transport areas and swept lanes to the beaches. Symbol was in the Gulf of St. Tropez from 15 to 31 August; sweeping during the day and patrolling at night. She swept channels of Marseille from 2 to 17 and from 25 to 30 September. Symbol swept in the Golfe de Juan in late October and off Cannes from 1 to 13 November. After an overhaul at Bizerte, she returned to Golfe de Juan from 6 to 9 December and then sailed for Bizerte, via Sardinia.

Symbol joined a convoy at Oran and sailed for the United States on 28 December 1944. She arrived at Norfolk, Virginia, on 17 January 1945 and was overhauled in preparation for duty in the Pacific.

== Pacific Ocean operations ==
She stood out of Norfolk on 27 March for Miami, Florida, where air-search radar was installed. The work was completed on 26 April, and Symbol sailed for California the next day. She arrived at San Diego, California, on 15 May and was underway again two days later en route to Hawaii. Pearl Harbor was reached on the 27th, and Symbol was routed onward, two weeks later, to Guam, Ulithi, and Okinawa.

Symbol arrived at Kerama Retto on 6 July and swept the "Juneau" area of the East China Sea from 10 to 14 and from 23 to 30 July. She swept the "Skagway" area of the East China Sea in August. Symbol sailed from Okinawa on 1 September for Japanese home waters and from 7 to 29 September swept the eastern and western approaches to Tsugaru Strait, Honshū. She operated off Hokkaidō for three days and returned to Tsugaru Strait until 8 October. She anchored at Ominato until the 18th and then went to Sasebo for a week. The ship next swept the "Klondike" area of the East China Sea from 27 October until 8 November when she returned to Sasebo. The ship sailed on 25 November and arrived at Kiirin, Formosa, on the 28th to sweep the "Sherlys" area, north of that island. She departed Kiirun on 20 December for China and arrived at Shanghai on the 22nd.

Symbol steamed out of Shanghai in early January 1946 bound for the United States via Pearl Harbor. Upon her arrival at San Diego, California, on 8 February, she was ordered to report to the 19th Fleet for duty without a preinactivation overhaul.

== Decommissioning ==
She was decommissioned on 31 May 1946. The minesweeper was given an overhaul at the Long Beach Naval Shipyard from 8 October to 26 November 1947 and returned to her berth at San Diego.

== Second Commissioning ==
Symbol was towed to Long Beach, California, on 15 October 1950 for activation and placed in commission again on 28 October 1950. The ship was overhauled at the Mare Island Naval Shipyard from 19 November 1950 to 26 January 1951. After shakedown and underway training, she operated off the California coast through December 1951. On 4 January 1952, Symbol stood out from Long Beach en route to the Korean War zone. She called at Pearl Harbor and Midway Island before arriving at Sasebo, Japan, on 1 February. The minesweeper operated in Korean waters from 7 to 25 February; 17 March to 20 April; 7 May to 9 June; and 29 June to 30 July. Symbol participated in extensive minesweeping and patrol operations on the east coast of Korea, including the sweep of Wonsan Harbor. She was also a unit of the United Nations Blockading and Escort Force. Symbol, operating with Toucan (AM-387), intercepted large numbers of communist sampans running food and supplies along the coast. The two ships shot up a total of 70 sampans while boat crews captured seven, taking 30 prisoners. Symbol returned to Long Beach, California, from her first tour in Korea on 2 September 1952.

Symbol, in company with Mine Division 54, sailed from Long Beach on 3 May 1953 for her second tour in Korean waters. She arrived at Sasebo on 29 May and moved to Korea on 18 June. During the next month, she participated in coastal minesweeping operations off the North Korean coast. She was straddled by North Korean shore batteries on 7 July, but not hit. Symbol patrolled around Cheju Do, South Korea, from 10 August to 15 September and off the southeast coast of Korea from 29 September to 20 October. The tour ended on 3 December 1953 at Long Beach.

Symbol was deployed to the western Pacific from 21 April to 10 November 1955 and operated along the Korean coast. Upon her return to California, she operated from her home port of Long Beach until 27 July 1956 when she was again placed in reserve, out of commission, and attached to the Pacific Reserve Fleet.

== Final decommissioning ==
Symbol was struck from the Navy list on 1 July 1972 and transferred to Mexico as a sale on 19 September 1972 to serve in the Mexican Navy as the ARM Guillermo Prieto (C71). The ship was later reclassified G02, before she was renamed to ARM Juan de la Barrera (P102) in 1993. As of 2007, Juan de la Barrera was in active service for the Mexican Navy.

== Awards ==
Symbol received five battle stars for World War II service and two for service in Korea.
