= Monumento a los Niños Héroes =

Monument in Chapultepec, Mexico City, Mexico

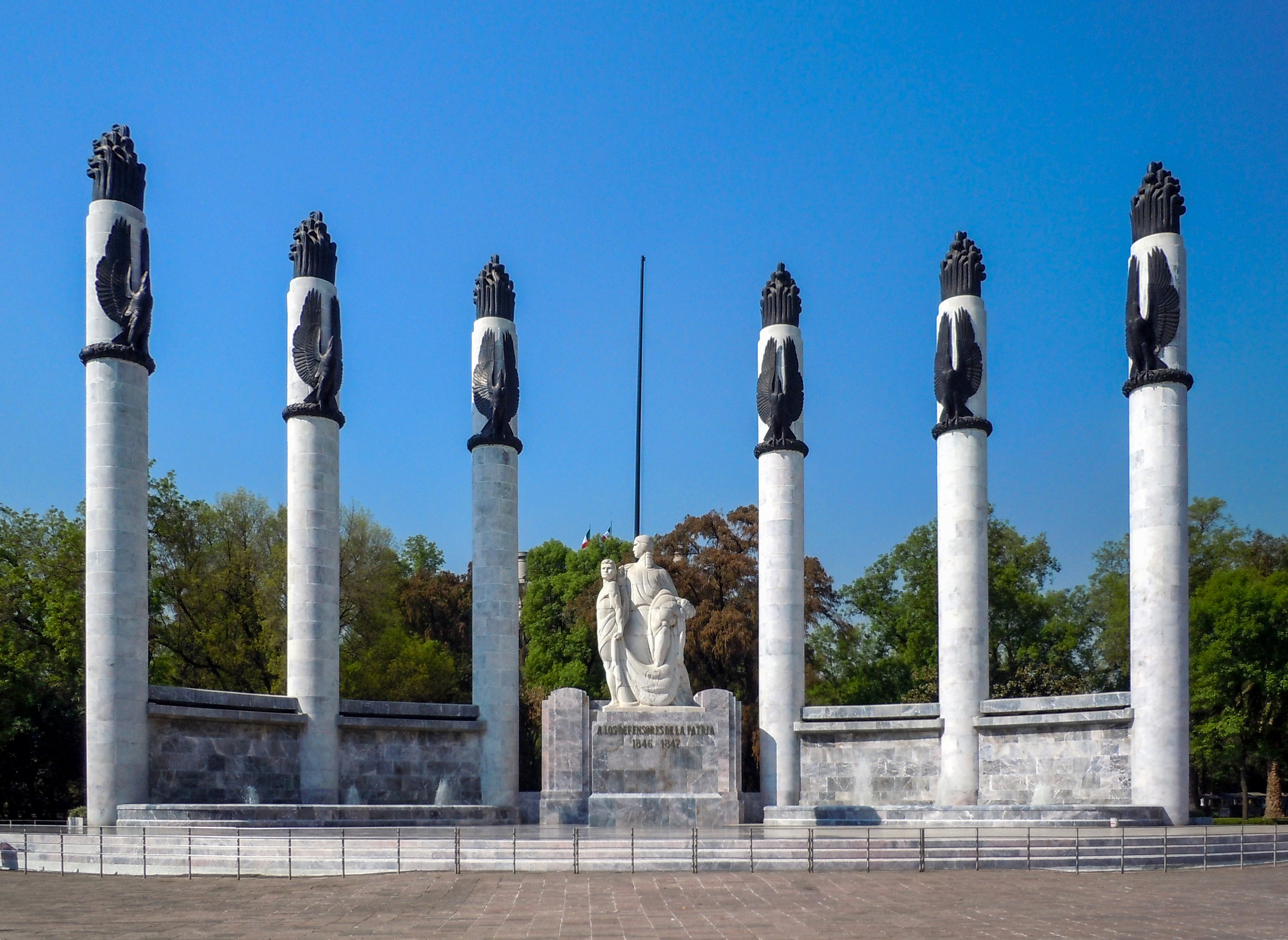
- The monument in 2011
- Interactive map of Monumento a los Niños Héroes
- Location: Mexico City, Mexico
- Coordinates: 19.4215515°N 99.1794551°W
- Dedicated to: Niños Héroes

The Monumento a los Niños Héroes ("Monument to the Boy Heroes"), officially Altar a la Patria ("Altar to the Homeland"), is a monument installed in the park of Chapultepec in Mexico City, Mexico. It commemorates the Niños Héroes, six mostly teenage military cadets who were killed defending Mexico City from the United States during the Battle of Chapultepec, one of the last major battles of the Mexican–American War, on 13 September 1847.

== Description and history ==
The six cadets are honored by an imposing monument made of Carrara marble by architect Enrique Aragón and sculptor Ernesto Tamariz at the entrance to Chapultepec Park (1952). This semicircular monument with six columns, placed at what was the end of the Paseo de la Reforma, a major thoroughfare leading from the central square (Zócalo) to Chapultepec Park. It contains a niche in each of its columns with an urn holding the remains of one of the cadets. In addition, the remains of Colonel Felipe Santiago Xicoténcatl were placed in the center of the monument below the main statue. The monument is dedicated to the combatants against the United States invasion with the phrase: "To the Defenders of the Fatherland 1846-1847". The monument's official name is Altar a la Patria (Altar to the Homeland), but it is better known as the Monumento a los Niños Héroes (Monument to the Boy Heroes) and many official texts use the popular name instead of the official name.

== See also ==
- Obelisco a los Niños Héroes
- Mexican-American War
- Niños Héroes
