= USS Ransom =

Minesweeper of the United States Navy

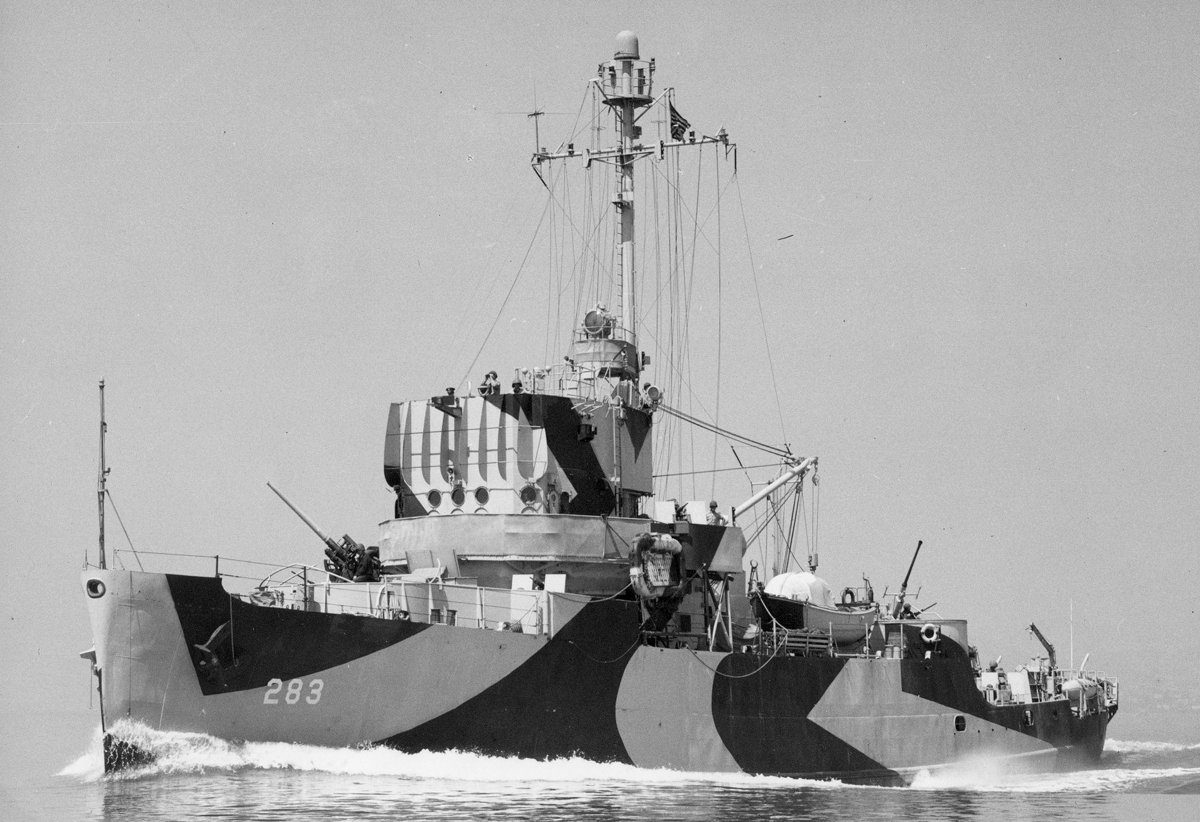
- Ransom in San Francisco Bay, California

History

United States
- Name: USS Ransom
- Builder: General Engineering & Dry Dock Company, Alameda, California
- Laid down: 24 April 1943
- Launched: 18 September 1943
- Commissioned: 5 August 1944
- Decommissioned: 3 March 1947
- Recommissioned: 16 March 1951
- Decommissioned: 22 September 1953
- Reclassified: MSF-283, 7 February 1955
- Stricken: 1 May 1962
- Fate: Transferred to Mexican Navy, 1962

History

Mexico
- Name: ARM DM-12
- Acquired: 1962
- Renamed: ARM Teniente Juan de la Barrera (C55), 1994
- Namesake: Juan de la Barrera
- Stricken: 2000
- Fate: Intentionally sunk for artificial reef

General characteristics
- Class & type: Admirable-class minesweeper
- Displacement: 650 long tons (660 t)
- Length: 184 ft 6 in (56.24 m)
- Beam: 33 ft (10 m)
- Draft: 9 ft 9 in (2.97 m)
- Propulsion: 2 × ALCO 539 diesel engines, 1,710 shp (1,280 kW); Farrel-Birmingham single reduction gear; 2 shafts
- Speed: 15 knots (28 km/h)
- Complement: 104
- Armament: 1 × 3"/50 caliber (76 mm) DP gun; 2 × twin Bofors 40 mm guns; 1 × Hedgehog anti-submarine mortar; 2 × Depth charge tracks

Service record
- Part of: U.S. Pacific Fleet (1944–1947); Atlantic Reserve Fleet (1947–1951, 1953–1962); U.S. Atlantic Fleet (1951–1953); Mexican Navy (1962–2000)
- Operations: Mariana and Palau Islands campaign; Battle of Okinawa
- Awards: 3 Battle stars

USS Ransom (AM-283) was an Admirable-class minesweeper built for the United States Navy during World War II. She was awarded three battle stars for service in the Pacific during World War II. She was decommissioned in March 1947 and placed in reserve. Although she did not see service in the war zone, Ransom was recommissioned in March 1951 during the Korean War and remained in commission until September 1953, when she was placed in reserve again. While she remained in reserve, Ransom was reclassified as MSF-283 in February 1955 but never reactivated. In 1962 she was sold to the Mexican Navy and renamed ARM DM-12. In 1994 she was renamed ARM Teniente Juan de la Barrera (C55). She was stricken in 2000, but her ultimate fate is not reported in secondary sources.

== U.S. Navy career ==
Ransom was laid down 24 April 1943 by General Engineering & Dry Dock Co., San Francisco, California; launched 18 September 1943; sponsored by Mrs. Dwight H. Dexter and commissioned 5 August 1944. After shakedown off the California coast, Ransom got underway for Hawaii 15 October and arrived at Pearl Harbor a week later for escort duty back to the west coast and later to Naval Base Eniwetok, Naval Base Ulithi, and Kossol Roads, arriving at the latter 12 January 1945. She then worked in the antisubmarine patrol screen off Peleliu.

From 1 to 18 February, Ransom acted as harbor entrance station vessel at Kossol, and patrolled in screens between Kossol and Peleliu, before proceeding to Ulithi to stage for Operation Iceberg. On 19 March she sailed for the Ryukyus with task unit TU 52.5.3 and, from 25 March to 18 April, she swept and patrolled in assigned areas around Okinawa despite heavy Japanese coastal and aerial resistance.

On 6 April, Ransom shot down three suicide aircraft while rescuing 52 survivors of USS Rodman (DMS-21) and USS Emmons (DMS-22). The third kamikaze's bomb caused some minor damage to Ransom. Relieved of sweeping duties 18 April, Ransom was assigned to antiaircraft and antisubmarine patrol. Although damaged on the 22nd by a bomb from a "Val" she had splashed 10 feet off her port quarter, Ransom continued to patrol through June.

On 4 July Ransom resumed minesweeping operations. Throughout the month she operated in the East China Sea, sweeping a total of seven mines, then, on 6 August, she retired to Leyte for overhaul and repair. Returning to Okinawa at the end of the month, she continued on to Japan with task group TG 52.4, and on 9 September began sweeping mines at Nagasaki. On 21 September, she shifted to Bungo Suido, where she swept until the end of September. During the month Ransom swept 73 enemy mines. Ransom departed Kure, Japan, for the United States 20 November. Transiting the Panama Canal 30 December 1945, she continued on to New Orleans, Louisiana; underwent pre-inactivation overhaul; and decommissioned at Orange, Texas, 3 March 1947.

Berthed at Orange for the next four years, Ransom recommissioned 16 March 1951. Assigned to the Atlantic Fleet, she operated out of Charleston, South Carolina, Norfolk, Virginia, and Yorktown, Virginia, through 1952. She then operated from New England to the Caribbean until decommissioned at Charleston in June 1953.

She arrived at Orange, Texas, 22 September and entered the Atlantic Reserve Fleet. Ransom was reclassified MSF-283 on 7 February 1955, and moved to Florida in November 1958 where she remained until struck from the Naval Vessel Register on 1 May 1962. She was sold to Mexico in 1962. Ransom earned three battle stars for World War II service.

== Mexican Navy career ==
The former Ransom was acquired by the Mexican Navy in 1962 and renamed ARM DM-12. In 1994, she was renamed ARM Teniente Juan de la Barrera (C55) after Juan de la Barrera. She was stricken in 2000, and was intentionally sunk to make an artificial reef off the coast of Cancun. In 2005 Hurricane Wilma hit the area and damaged the ransom and other local man made reefs. Depth is approximately 75 feet and has very little penetration on the back deck of the wreck. The rest of the wreck is just in pieces, but the stern can be appreciated resting to its left side.
