= Barrera =

Barrera is a Spanish, Portuguese and Italian surname, meaning "barrier".

The name has many variant spellings of the name which include: Barrios, de Barrios, Barrio, de Barrio, Barro, Barros, de Barros, Barroso, Barrera, de Barrera, de la Barrera, de Barreda, Barral, Barreto, Barrientos, Bareis, Barela, Barreras, Barrere, Barresi, Barreto, Barretta, Barrios, Barris, Barros, Barrientos and Barroso and many more, were first found in the Kingdom of Castile, a Christian kingdom of medieval Spain.

== History ==
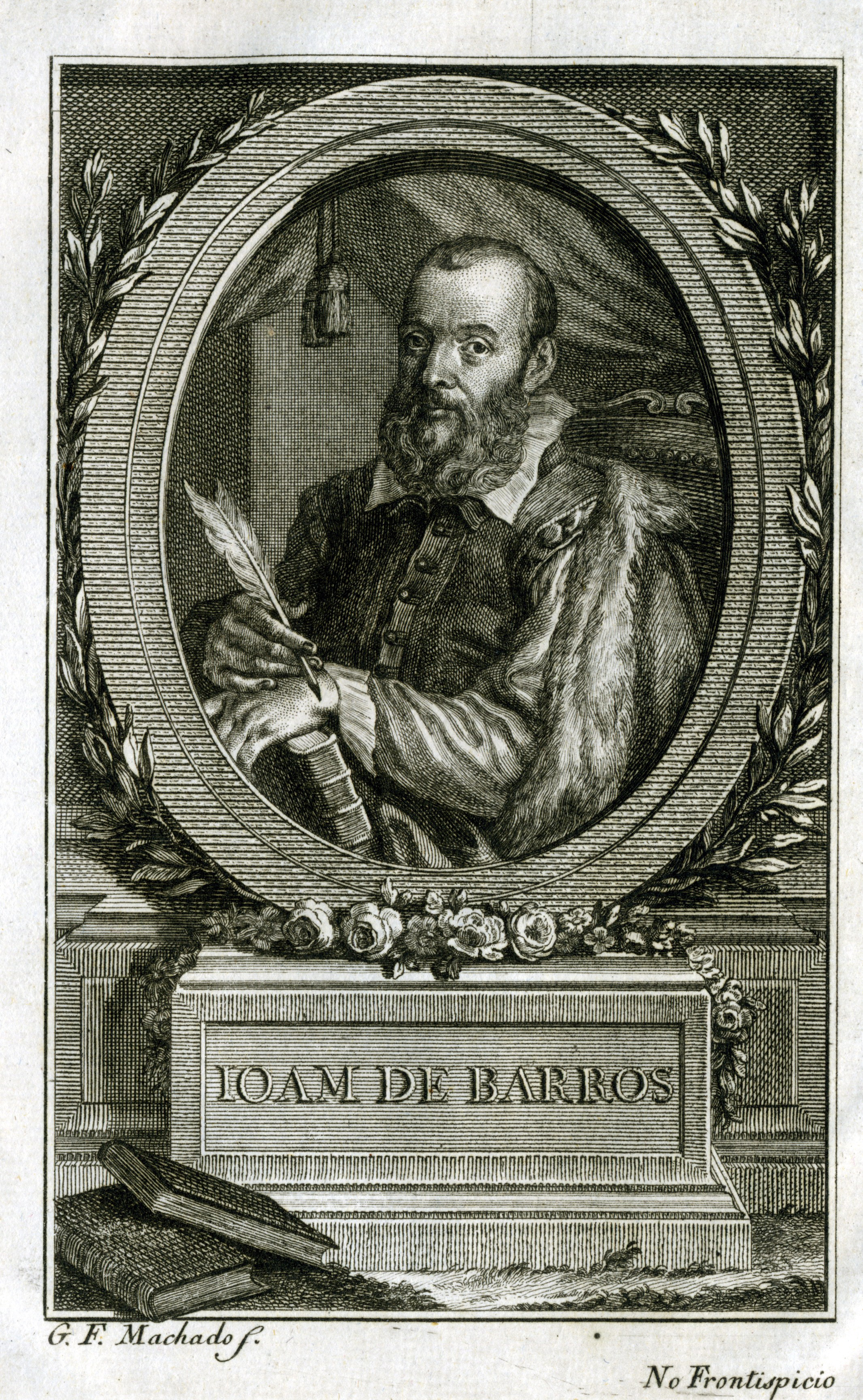
João de Barros (1496–1570), Portuguese historian.

Surnames derived from place names are divided into two broad categories; Topographic names and Habitation names. Topographic names are derived from general descriptive references to someone who lived near a physical feature such as an oak tree, a hill, a stream or a church. Habitation names are derived from pre-existing names denoting towns, villages and farmsteads. Other classes of local names include those derived from the names of rivers, individual houses with signs on them, regions and whole countries. A notable member of the name was Joao de Barros (1496-1570) the Portuguese historian, born in Visey. He was the governor of Portuguese Guinea, and is known for his monumental 'Decades' (1552-1615) the history of the Portuguese in the East Indies. Portuguese surnames share many of the features of Spanish surnames, in particular Arabic and Visigoth influence.

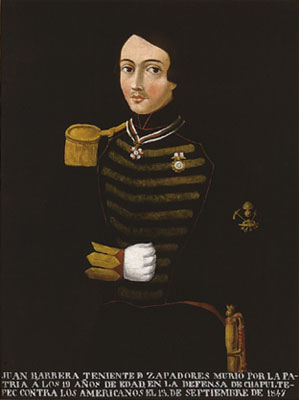
Juan de la Barrera (1828–1847), one of six of the Niños Héroes (Boy Heroes) of Mexico.

Another such figure is that of Juan de la Barrera, one of six of the Niños Héroes or (Boy Heroes) of Mexico. Born in (1828-1847) in Mexico City, the son of Ignacio Mario de la Barrera, an army general, and Juana Inzárruaga. He enlisted at the age of 12 and was admitted to the Academy on 18 November 1843. During the attack on Chapultepec he was a Lieutenant in the military engineers or sappers, and died defending a gun battery at the entrance to the park. Aged 19, he was the oldest of the six, and was also part of the school faculty as a volunteer teacher in engineering. Another family member was also a government official that has held the title of governor, he was Jacinto Barrera, whom was Governor of Baja California, and was Chief Executive of the North District of the Federal Territory of Baja California in 1911.

The family Coat of arms is a red shield with a grey tower centered between two facing, rearing greyhounds. The Barrera family history mentions Isabel Barreto (1567–1612), was a Spanish female sailor and traveler, considered one of the first women to hold the title for office of Admiral in history, who traveled to the Americas in the 1500s; she later became Governor or Adelantado of the Santa Cruz Islands. Some members of this family name were early settlers to the Americas were; Fernán Barrera, who sailed to the Americas in 1512, Diego Barrera, sailed to America in 1535, Gonzalo de Barrera, sailed to the Spanish Main in 1538, Juan de la Barrera, sailed to New Spain in 1555, Franco Barrera arrived in Pennsylvania in 1774, Blas Barrera landed in Puerto Rico in 1803, Pedro Barrera landed in America in 1812, Diego Barrera, arrived in America in 1835, and Juan de la Barrera, whom arrived in New Spain in 1855.

== Notable people with the surname ==
- Antonio Imbert Barrera (1920—2016), Dominican politician
- Benjamin Barrera y Reyes (1902–1999), Salvadorian bishop
- Dagoberto Rodríguez Barrera (born 1955), Cuban diplomat
- Ernesto Barrera (died 1978), Salvadorian assassinated bishop
- Rafael Rodríguez Barrera (1937–2011), Mexican politician, lawyer, and diplomat
- Roberto González Barrera (1930–2012), Mexican businessman
- Abel Barrera Hernández (1991), Mexican Anthropologist and human rights activist
- Edgar Barrera (1990), American Musician

== Sports players ==
- Alejandro Barrera (born 1988), Mexican boxer
- Dan Barrera, American mixed martial artist
- Elkin Barrera (born 1971), Colombian road cyclist
- Jesse Barrera (born 1987), American musician
- Jorge Barrera (born 1982), Mexican footballer
- Laz Barrera (1924–1991), American racehorse trainer
- Melissa Barrera (born 1985), American radio and television personality
- Nelson Barrera (1957–2002), Mexican baseball player
- Rodrigo Barrera (born 1970), Chilean footballer
- Jason Barrera (1997–, Harlem Globetrotter

== Sports players and actors ==
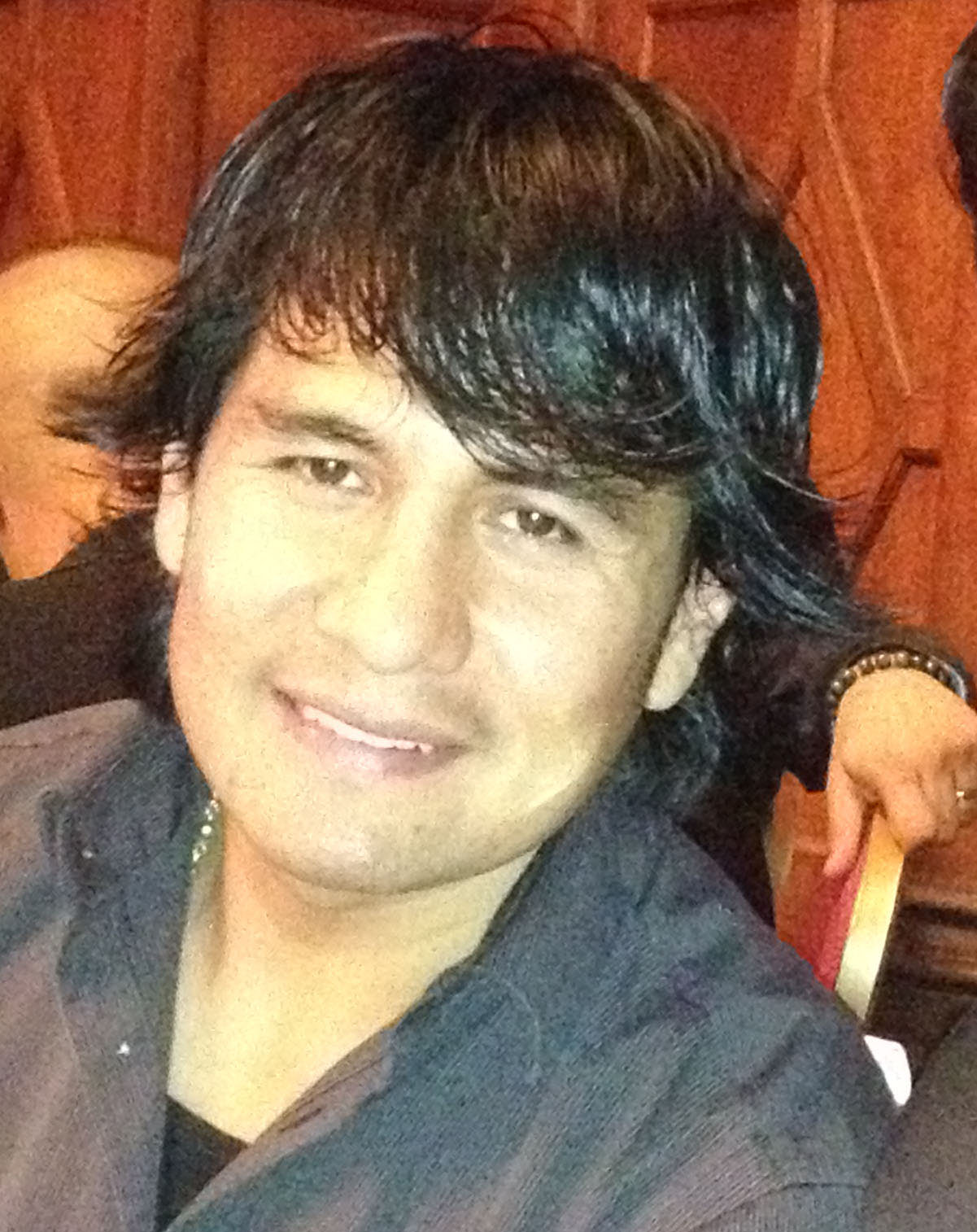
Marco Antonio Barrera, (January 17, 1974), is a Mexican former professional boxer

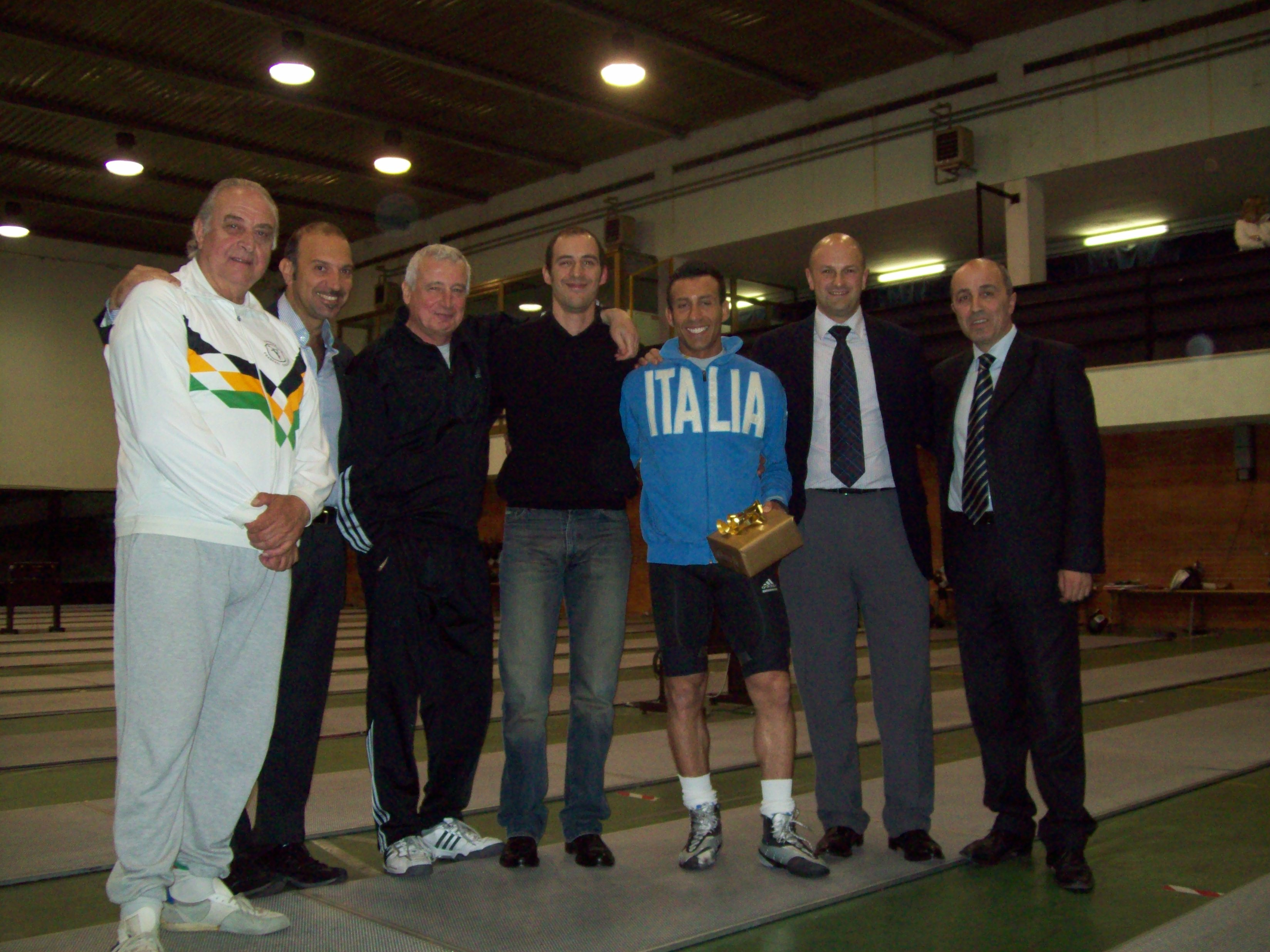
Stefano Barrera (born 1980), Italian Foil Fencing

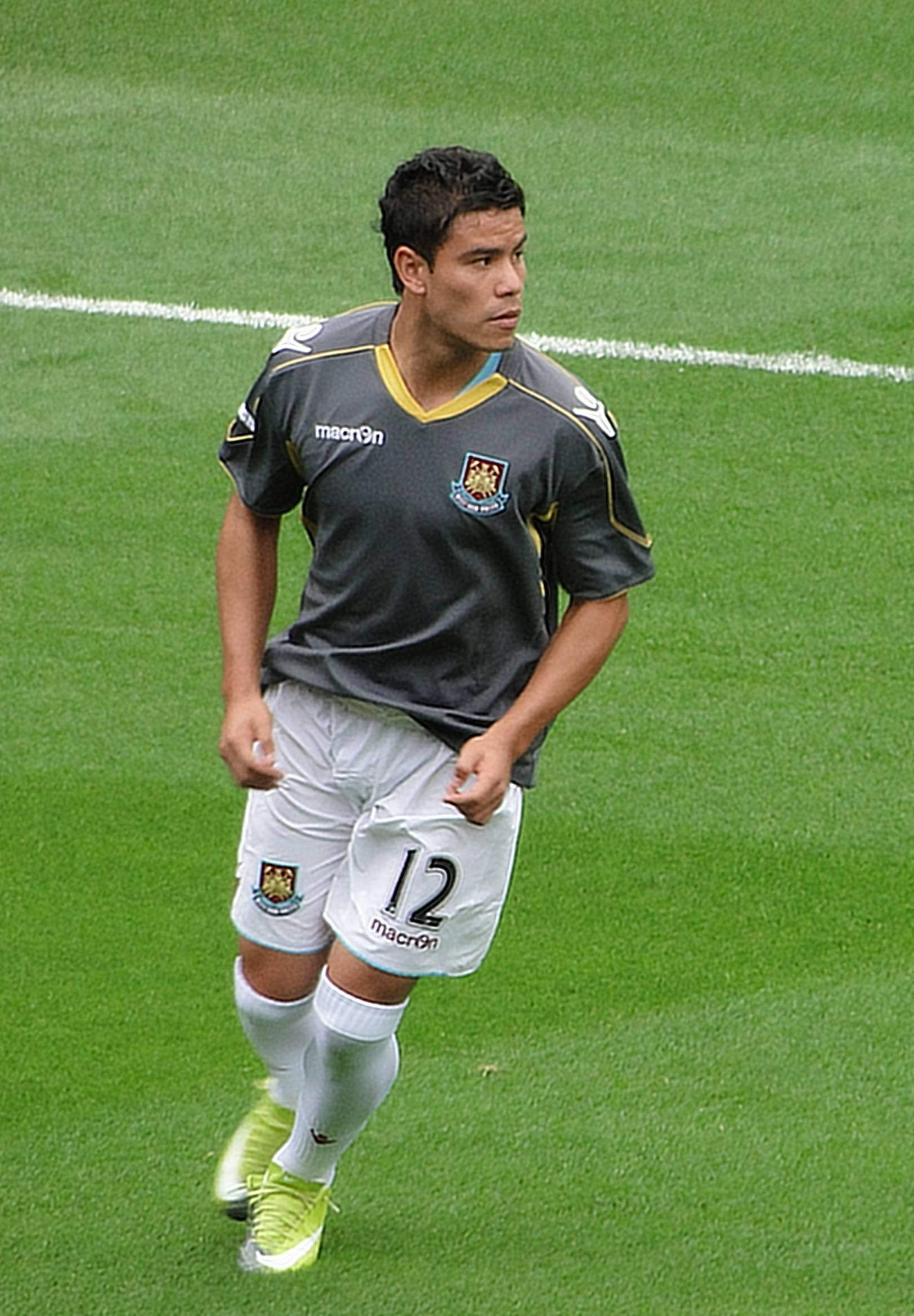
Pablo Barrera, Mexican Football player

Evaristo Barrera (1911–1982), Argentine football player

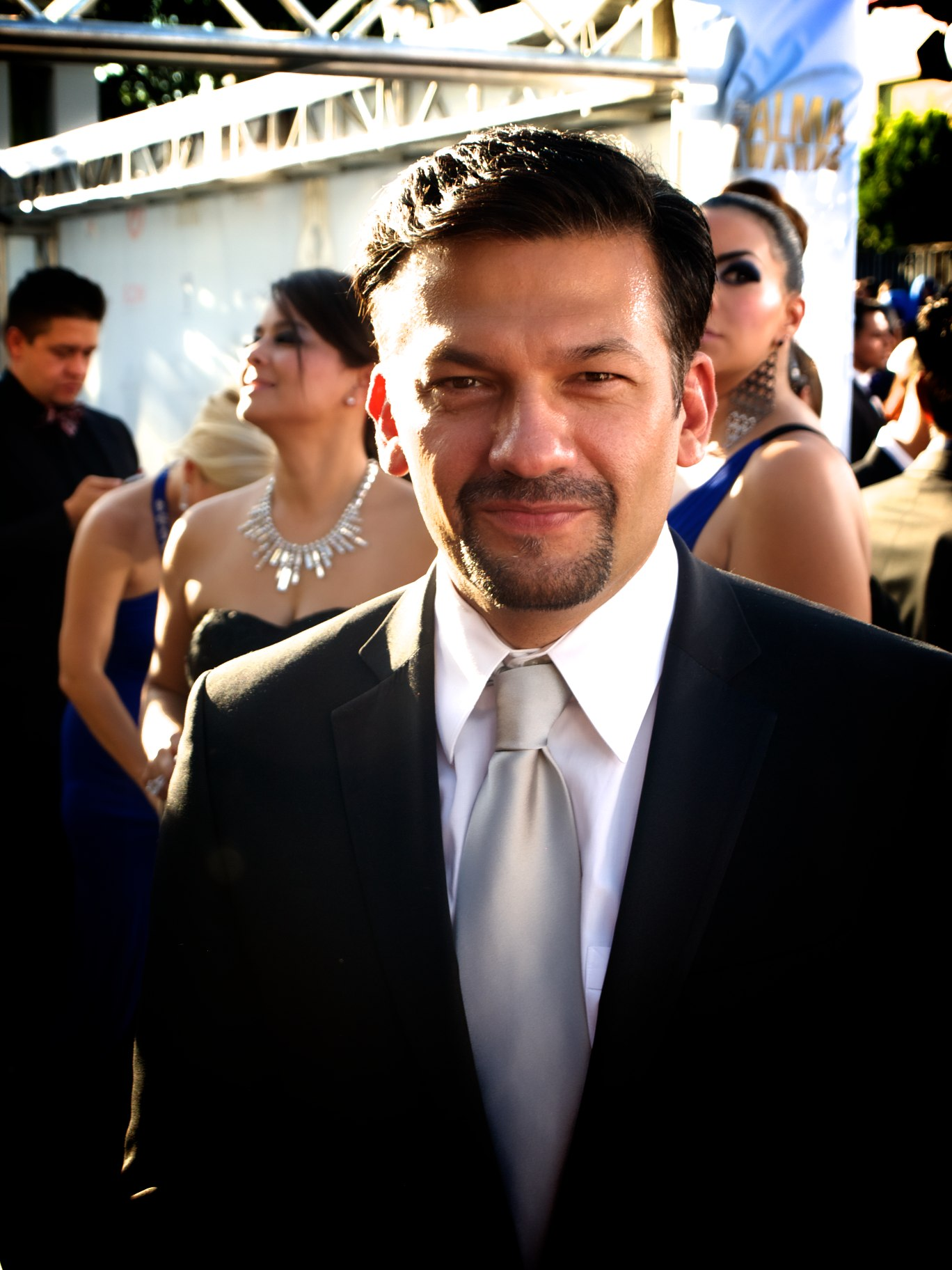
David Barrera, American actor

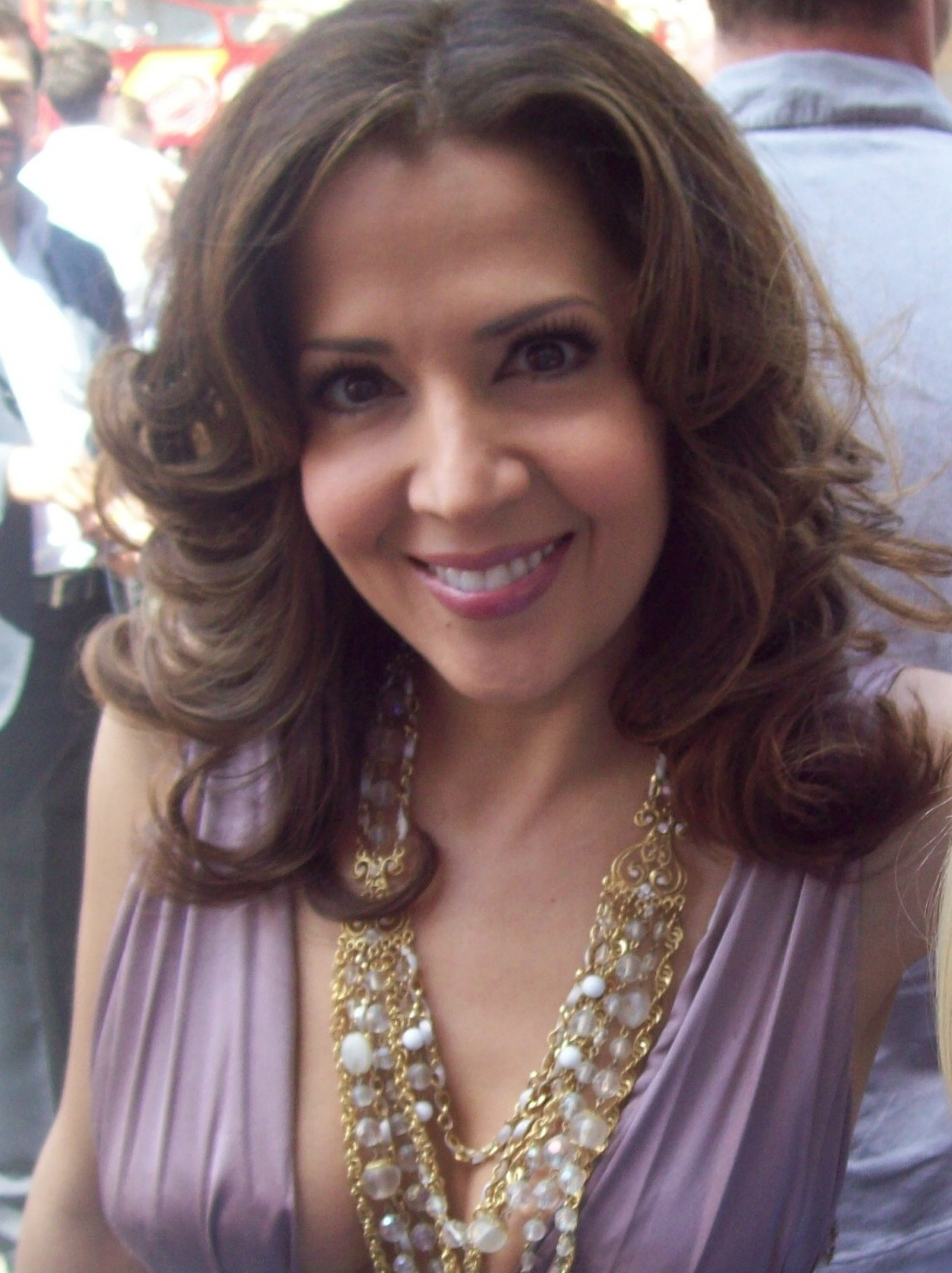
Maria Canals-Barrera American actress

== Fictional characters with the name ==
- Guillermo Barrera or Brutale, DC Comics supervillain
