= Statue of Gabriel Flores =

Statue in Guadalajara, Jalisco, Mexico

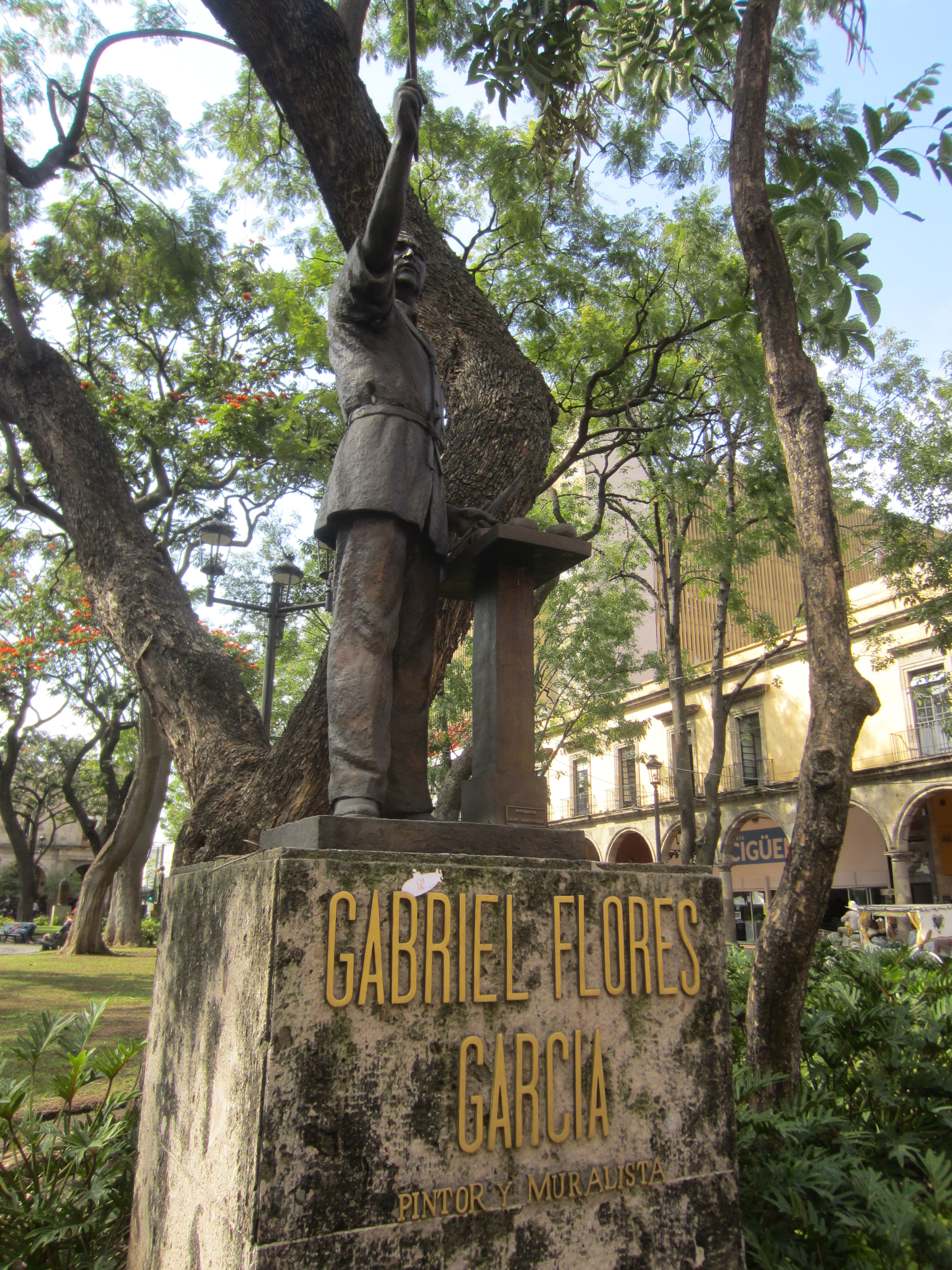
- The statue in 2021
- Subject: Gabriel Flores
- Location: Guadalajara, Jalisco, Mexico; 20°40′40.7″N 103°20′48.1″W

A statue of Gabriel Flores is installed along the Rotonda de los Jaliscienses Ilustres, in Centro, Guadalajara, in the Mexican state of Jalisco.
