= Monumento a los Fundadores de Puebla =

Sculpture in Puebla, Mexico

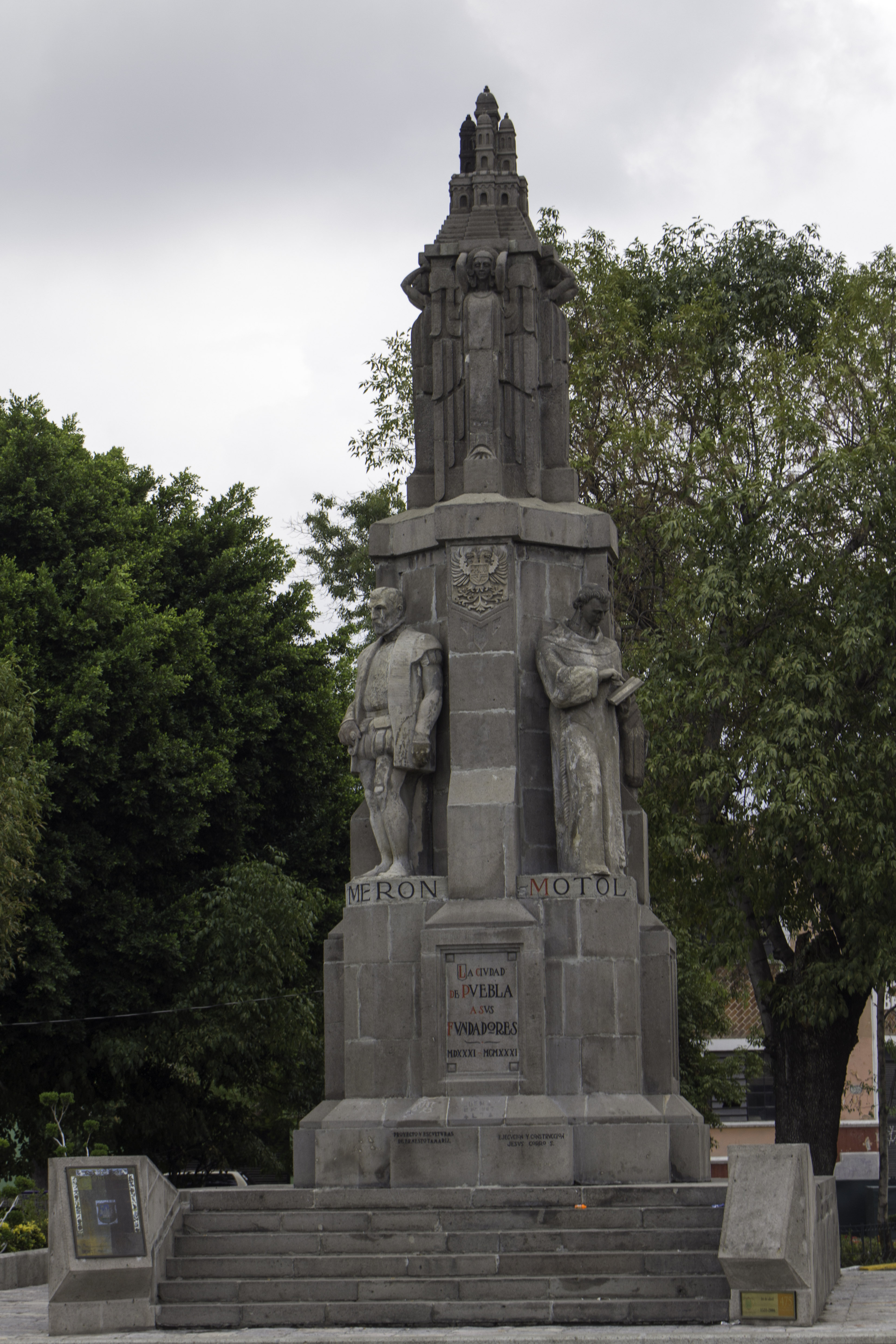
- The monument in 2012
- Artist: Ernesto Tamariz
- Location: Puebla, Puebla, Mexico; 19°2′43.7″N 98°11′23.6″W

The Monumento a los Fundadores de Puebla is installed in Puebla, in the Mexican state of Puebla. It is the work of Ernesto Tamariz.

== Description ==
The monument consists of an octagonal semipyramidal basement and eclectic style with art deco influence. In the first body, in the upper part an allegory of the city represented by a colonial church built under a Mesoamerican pyramid. In the next body, four angels like Atlanteans support it, in allegory of the founding myth of the city. Below the third body is a set of four sculptures representing Isabel I of Castile, Juan de Salmerón, Julián Garcés, and Toribio de Benavente «Motolinía», 2 which have their names written at their feet. They are divided by pillars that in their upper part have heraldic shields, among them the shield of the city of Puebla de los Ángeles and that of Carlos I of Spain, some of which have been detached or damaged. The last body has different explanatory plates; one indicates "The city of Puebla to its founders, MDXXXI - MCMXXI". Another indicates "Erected by private initiative and by public subscription."

== History ==
Towards the 30s, the capital of Puebla suffered a strong urban expansion towards the Cerro de San Juan area, creating Avenida Juárez as an architectural axis. On the occasion of the fourth centenary of the founding of Puebla, which occurred in 1531, a competition was called in 1928, which was won by the sculptor Ernesto Tamariz. In order to obtain funds for its construction, a committee was formed, headed by Mrs. Serafina Cabrera and Bernardo Tamariz.

The fourth centenary of the Puebla capital brought with it a discussion between various historians and writers in order to clarify the history of the founding of the city and its related characters. Although the initial efforts to establish the new city took place interchangeably between 1531 and 1534, at the time the official date was defined as April 16, 1531.

It was located on Avenida Juárez and 15 Sur, laying the first stone on April 16, 1931. It was completed in 1935, being removed in 1960 to its current location on Paseo San Francisco, between Boulevard 5 de Mayo and Calle avenida 14 east.
