= Gabriel Flores =

Mexican painter and muralist (1930–1993)

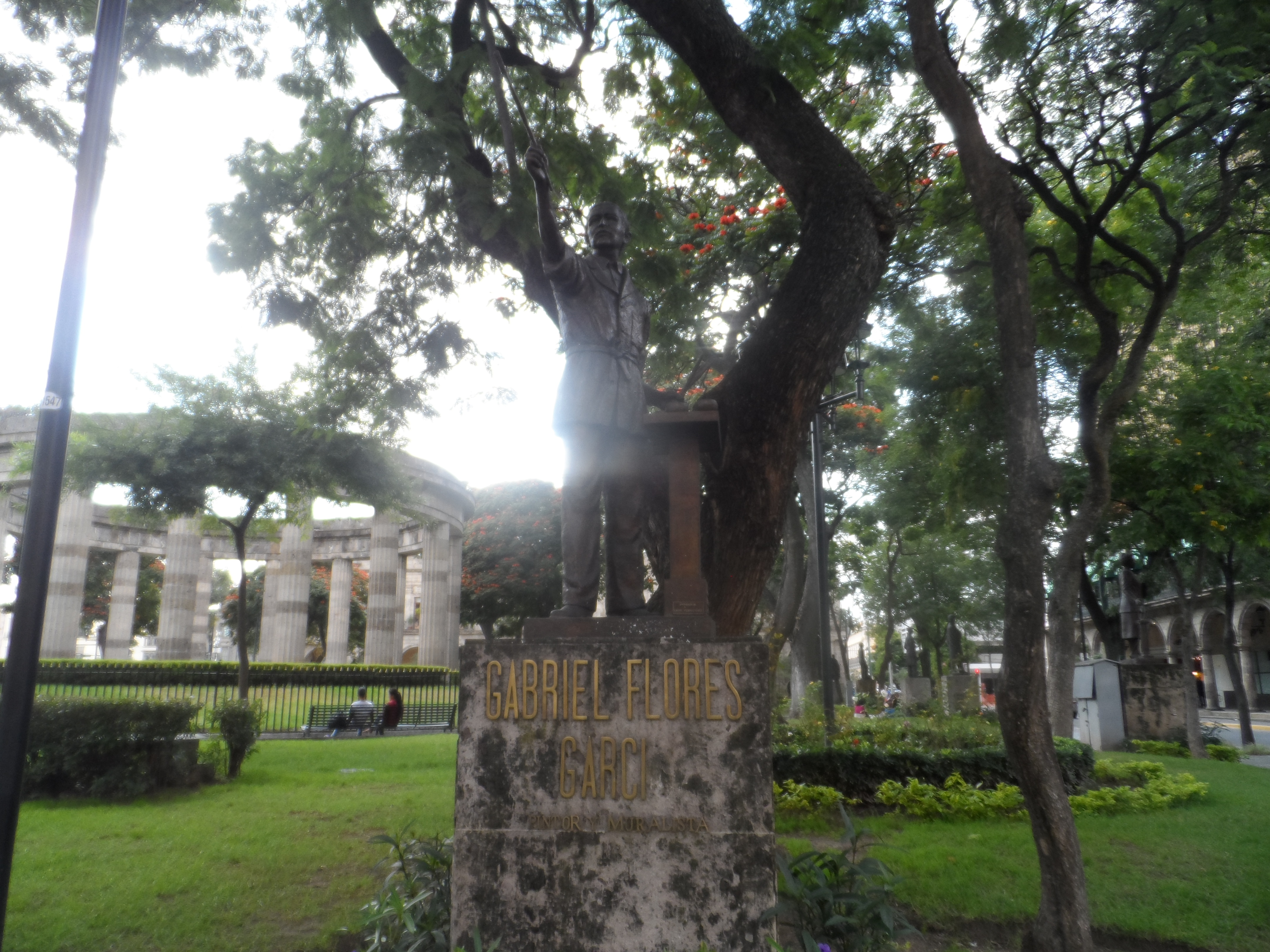
- Statue of Flores in Guadalajara
- Born: Gabriel Flores García; February 8, 1930; Guadalajara, Jalisco, Mexico
- Died: December 14, 1993 (aged 63); Guadalajara, Jalisco, Mexico
- Known for: Painting, Muralist
- Notable work: El parnason jalisciense (1958), La filosofía y la ciencia (1965), Los Niños Héroes (1967)
- Awards: Premio Jalisco, Medalla a las Artes Plásticases

Gabriel Flores (February 9, 1930 – December 14, 1993) was a Mexican painter and muralist born in Guadalajara, Jalisco. Between 1956 and 1993, his murals focused on historical and universal themes, as well as the ability of art functioning as social commentary. In the 1960s, at the height of his career, he created his magnum opus Los Niños Héroes, depicting the sacrifice of six child soldiers during the Mexican-American War. Gabriel Flores described himself, saying "I do not want much; I have what I like, above all my freedom."

== Life ==
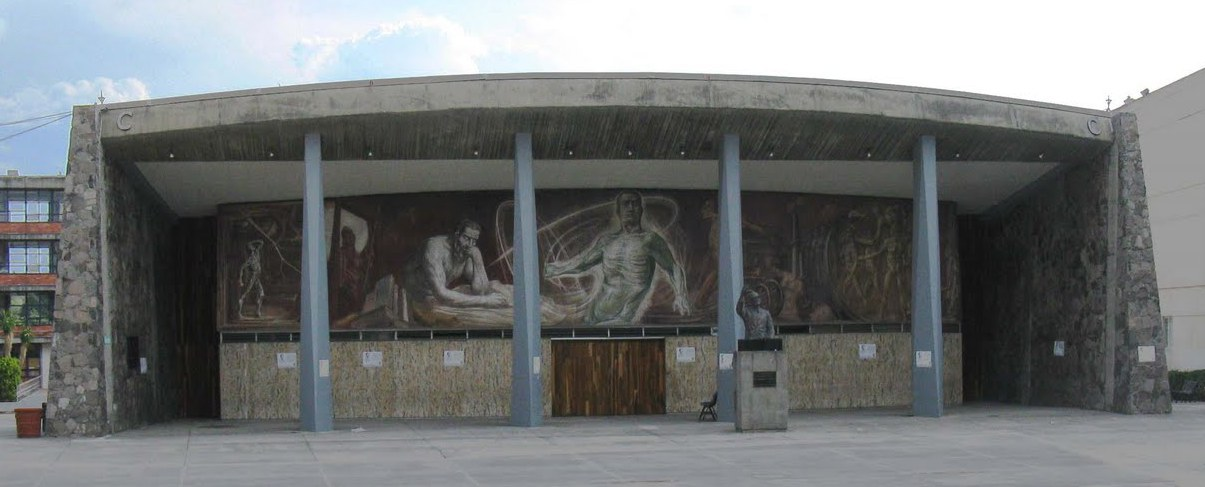
La filosofía y la ciencia (1965) at the University of Guadalajara

Gabriel Flores García was born on February 8, 1930, in Guadalajara, Jalisco, although some sources mention El Arenal. He was involved in the arts since early childhood and at the age of 17, he began his formal art studies. In 1948, he entered the School of Fine Arts at the University of Guadalajara. Together with Guillermo Chávez Vega, Torreblanca, Miguel Aldana and Ignacio Martínez, they formed the Neo-realist art group, running counter to the abstract art movement at the time. His early influences included Diego Rivera and José Clemente Orozco, both members of the Mexican Mural Renaissance in the 1920s and 1930s.

His first achievement came early in 1951 when the Benjamin Franklin Library of Guadalajara presented an exhibition of his works. Soon thereafter, he lived in Mexico City for a period of four years, where he worked alongside other distinguished painters. At 25 years of age, he returned to his native land of Jalisco and abandoned his brief teaching duties to focus his career as a muralist. His second exhibition in Guadalajara featured the mural, El maíz en la Colonia, now lost. With an established recognition in the region, he was selected by then governor of Jalisco Agustín Yáñez to create two murals in the Public Library of the State, La imprenta en Jalisco (The Printing Press in Jalisco) and El parnaso jalisciense (The Jaliscan Parnassus), the latter of which is one of his most representative works.

In 1960, he painted Alegoria de la Guerra y la Paz in the state of Michoacán, though it was later transferred to the governmental offices in Guadalajara. Two years later, he was given the Jalisco Award in Culture, a recognition observed by the city to Jaliscans with excellence in the visual arts. The city council also declared Gabriel Flores a "favorite son" and included his name in the School of Painters near Agua Azul park.

He reached his career high point in the latter half of the 1960s. In creating La filosofía y la ciencia (Philosophy and Science) at the Salvador Allende auditorium in the University of Guadalajara, he sought to bring attention to the realities of poverty, social injustice, discrimination and consequences of industrialism and technology. Los Niños Héroes, painted in Chapultepec Castle in 1967, honors the child heroes who died in the Battle of Chapultepec during the Mexican–American War. The mural depicts a Mexican military cadet jumping from the tower of Chapultepec Castle in 1847 wrapped in the Mexican flag in order to prevent its capture by the U.S. military forces. As a presentation to tequila, one of Jalisco's largest exports, he accepted a request to paint Tahona y fiesta and Mitología e historia del tequila for Casa Sauza, a liquor factory in Tequila, Jalisco.

There was a change in subject matter for Flores' murals at the turn of the 1970s, shifting from historical and universal themes to works containing his own ideas and feelings on social and political events. He painted a series of murals, including Culto al Dinero (Worship of Money) and Estampas de la vida (Prints of Life), which did not garner much praise and were removed from exhibitions.

In 1984, at the age of 54, the Jalisco government awarded him the Medal of the Arts. The state governor commissioned his last work, La historia de la medicina en Guadalajara (The History of Medicine in Guadalajara), which was completed at Antiguo Hospital Civil in 1992, just one year prior to his death. In 2005, he was recognized by the University of Guadalajara and was honored by the state congress as a distinguished Jaliscan painter.

== Partial list of works ==
1. La cortina de humo (1953), Escuela de Artes Plasticas de la Universidad de Guadalajara (desaparecido). Guadalajara, Jalisco, México. Caseína, 14 m^{2}.
2. El maíz en la Colonia (1955), Gobierno del Estado (desaparecido). Guadalajara, Jalisco, México. Temple 30 m^{2}.
3. La novela revolucionaria de Mariano Azuela (1956), Escuela "Mariano Azuela". Lagos de Moreno, Jalisco, México. Cerámica 25 m^{2}.
4. La primera imprenta en Jalisco (1958), Sala de Lectura, Biblioteca Pública del Estado. Guadalajara, Jalisco, México. Acrilato 13 m^{2}.
5. El parnaso jalisciense (1958), Biblioteca Pública del Estado. Guadalajara, Jalisco, México. Acrilato 216 m.
6. Alegoría del teatro en México (1960), Teatro Experimental de Jalisco. m^{2}.
7. La guerra y la paz (1960), Banco de Zamora. Guadalajara, Jalisco, México. Acrílico 15.30 x 2.50 m^{2}.
8. Fundación de Guadalajara (1962), Palacio Municipal. Guadalajara, Jalisco, México. Acrílico 4.50 x 2.60 m².
9. Maternidad (1963), Maternidad, "López Mateos", Guadalajara, Jalisco, México. Acrílico.
10. Pedro Moreno (1964) Escuela Preparatoria. Lagos de Moreno, Jalisco, México.
11. La filosofía y la ciencia (1965), Auditorio "Salvador Allende" del Centro Universitario de Ciencias Sociales y Humanidades de la Universidad de Guadalajara. Guadalajara, Jalisco, México. Acrílico.
12. Las Bellas Artes (1966). Oficinas del Departamento de Bellas Artes del Gobierno del Estado. Guadalajara, Jalisco, México. Acrílico.
13. Los Niños Héroes (1967), Castillo de Chapultepec, México, D.F. Acrílico.
14. Las artesanías (1968), Casa de las Artesanías del Estado. Guadalajara, Jalisco, México. Acrílico, 6.0 x 1.50 m.
15. Tahona y fiesta (1969), Fabrica de Tequila Sauza. Tequila, Jalisco, México. Acrílico, 14.0 x 3.50 m.
16. Mitología e historia del tequila (1970), Oficinas de la fábrica de Tequila Sauza. Guadalajara, Jalisco, México. Acrílico sobre tela.
17. Culto al dinero (1975). "Sucesos núm. 1", Gobierno del Estado. Guadalajara, Jalisco, México. Acrílico sobre tela 10.0 x 2.50 m.
18. Estampas de la vida (1975), "Sucesos núm. 2", Gobierno del Estado. Guadalajara, Jalisco, México. Acrílico sobre tela 10.0 x 2.50 m.
19. Cervantes y su obra (1978). Colección particular Eulalio Ferrer. México, D.F. Museo Iconográfico del Quijote en Guanajuato, Guanajuato.
20. Nuestra civilización (1979), edificio del Sistema de Educación Media y Superior (SEMS) de la Universidad de Guadalajara.
21. El fracaso de nuestra civilización (1980), edificio del Sistema de Educación Media y Superior (SEMS) de la Universidad de Guadalajara.
22. Fantasía infantil (1982), DIF, Jalisco.
23. La patria (1988), Procuraduría General de la República (PGR), México.
24. Justicia y libertad (1988), Procuraduría General de la República (PGR), México.
25. Historia de la medicina (1993), Hospital Civil "Fray Antonio Alcalde" Guadalajara.

== See also ==
- Statue of Gabriel Flores, Guadalajara
