= Obelisco a los Niños Héroes =

Monument in Chapultepec park, Mexico City, Mexico

- The obelisk in 2024
- Interactive map of Obelisco a los Niños Héroes
- Location: Chapultepec, Mexico City, Mexico
- Coordinates: 19.42046°N 99.18034°W

The Obelisco a los Niños Héroes is a monument installed in Chapultepec, Mexico City. The cenotaph was created in 1881 by architect Ramón Rodríguez Arangoity, one of the cadets captured in the Battle of Chapultepec. The marble cenotaph was a typical nineteenth-century monument. This one lists the names of the six cadets, the Niños Héroes, killed in the fierce fighting in the Mexican–American War as military cadets defended as well as the 40 who survived the attack. For his own political purposes, General Porfirio Díaz inaugurated the monument with a military and civilian audience of dignitaries. Subsequently, the obelisk became an annual site of remembrance for the Association of the Military College, a group of veterans who had been cadets. This modest-sized monument was superseded in 1952 by the massive Monumento a los Niños Héroes.

The prisoners of the First Company were Captain Domingo Alvarado; Lieutenants José Espinosa, Agustín de la Peza; Cabo José T. de Cuellar; and Tambor Simón Álvarez; Cadets Francisco Molina, Mariano Covarrubias, Bartolomé Díaz León, Ignacio Molina, Antonio Sierra, Justino García, Lorenzo Pérez Castro, Agustín Camarena, Ignacio Ortiz, Manuel Ramírez de Arellano, Carlos Bejarano, Isidro Hernández, Esteban Zamora, Santiago Hernández, Ignacio Burgoa Lagos and Ramón Rodríguez Arangoity. Prisoners of Second Company were Lieutenant Joaquín Argaez; Sargeant Teófilo Noris; Corneta Antonio Rodríguez; Cadet alumni Joaquín Moreno, Pablo Banuet, Ignacio Valle, Francisco Leso, Antonio Sola, Sebastián Trejo, Luis Delgado, Ruperto Pérez de León, Cástulo García, Feliciano Contreras, Francisco Morelos, Miguel Miramón, Gabino Montesdedca, Luciano Becerra, Adolfo Unda, Manuel Díaz, Francisco Morel, Vicente Herrera, Onofre Capelo, Magdaleno Yta and Emilio Laurent.

== See also ==
- Heroic Military Academy
- Mexican–American War
- Niños Héroes
