= Ernesto Tamariz =

Mexican sculptor (1904–1988)

- Born: Ernesto Tamariz Galicia; 11 January 1904; Acatzingo, Puebla, Mexico
- Died: 30 September 1988 (aged 84)
- Known for: Sculpture
- Notable work: Memorial to the Mexican cadets killed in the Battle of Chapultepec (Niños Héroes)
- Movement: Art Deco, Art Nouveau, Eclecticism

Ernesto Tamariz Galicia (11 January 1904 – 30 September 1988) was a 20th-century Mexican sculptor specialized in public monuments, religious statues and funerary art.

His most famous work is "Altar to the Fatherland" (Altar a la patria), a memorial to the Mexican cadets killed during the Battle of Chapultepec (Niños Héroes). He also sculpted the statue of St Pio of Pietrelcina and John Paul II at the old Basilica of Our Lady of Guadalupe, the new central altar of the Metropolitan Cathedral of Mexico City, the tomb of Alfonso Reyes at the Rotunda of Illustrious People and the tomb of Ignacio Zaragoza, among others.

== Works ==
According to María Estela Duarte, curator of Épica y gloria monumental ("Epic and monumental glory"), a posthumous exposition of Tamariz at the Diego Rivera and Frida Kahlo Museum of Mexico City, the sculptor completed some 128 monuments throughout Mexico.

=== List of works ===
1. "Altar to the Fatherland" (Altar a la patria), a memorial to the Mexican cadets killed in the Battle of Chapultepec (Niños Héroes).
2. Statue of St Pio of Pietrelcina inside the old Basilica of Our Lady of Guadalupe.
3. Statue of John Paul II between the old and the new the basilicas of Our Lady of Guadalupe.
4. A central altar sculpted in onyx for the Metropolitan Cathedral of Mexico City.
5. The tomb of Alfonso Reyes at the Rotunda of Illustrious People.
6. The tomb of General Ignacio Zaragoza at San Fernando Cemetery in Mexico City.
7. Statue of Benito Juárez (San Diego)
Gallery of selected works

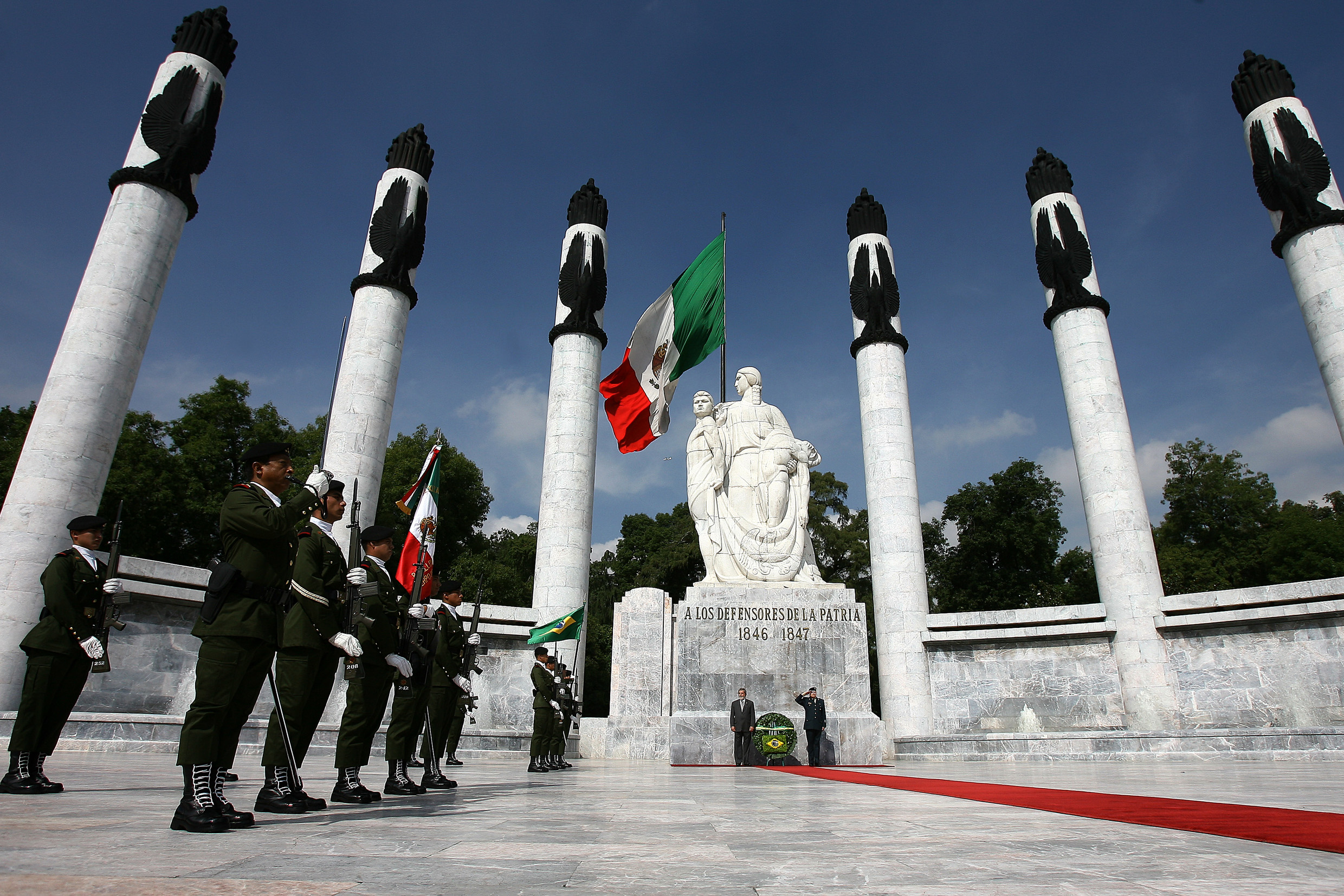
Memorial to the Mexican cadets killed in the Battle of Chapultepec.

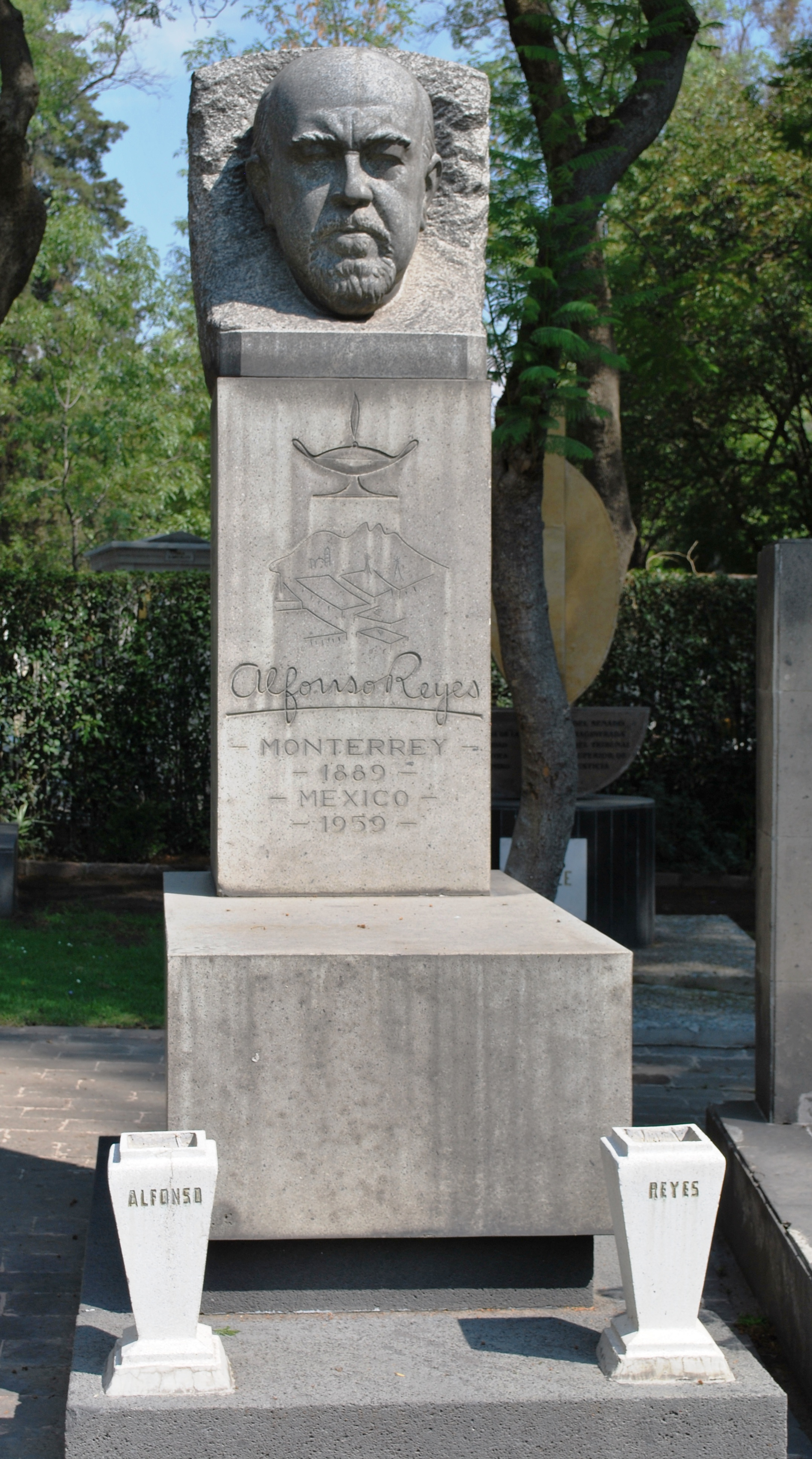
Tomb of Alfonso Reyes at the Rotunda of Illustrious People.

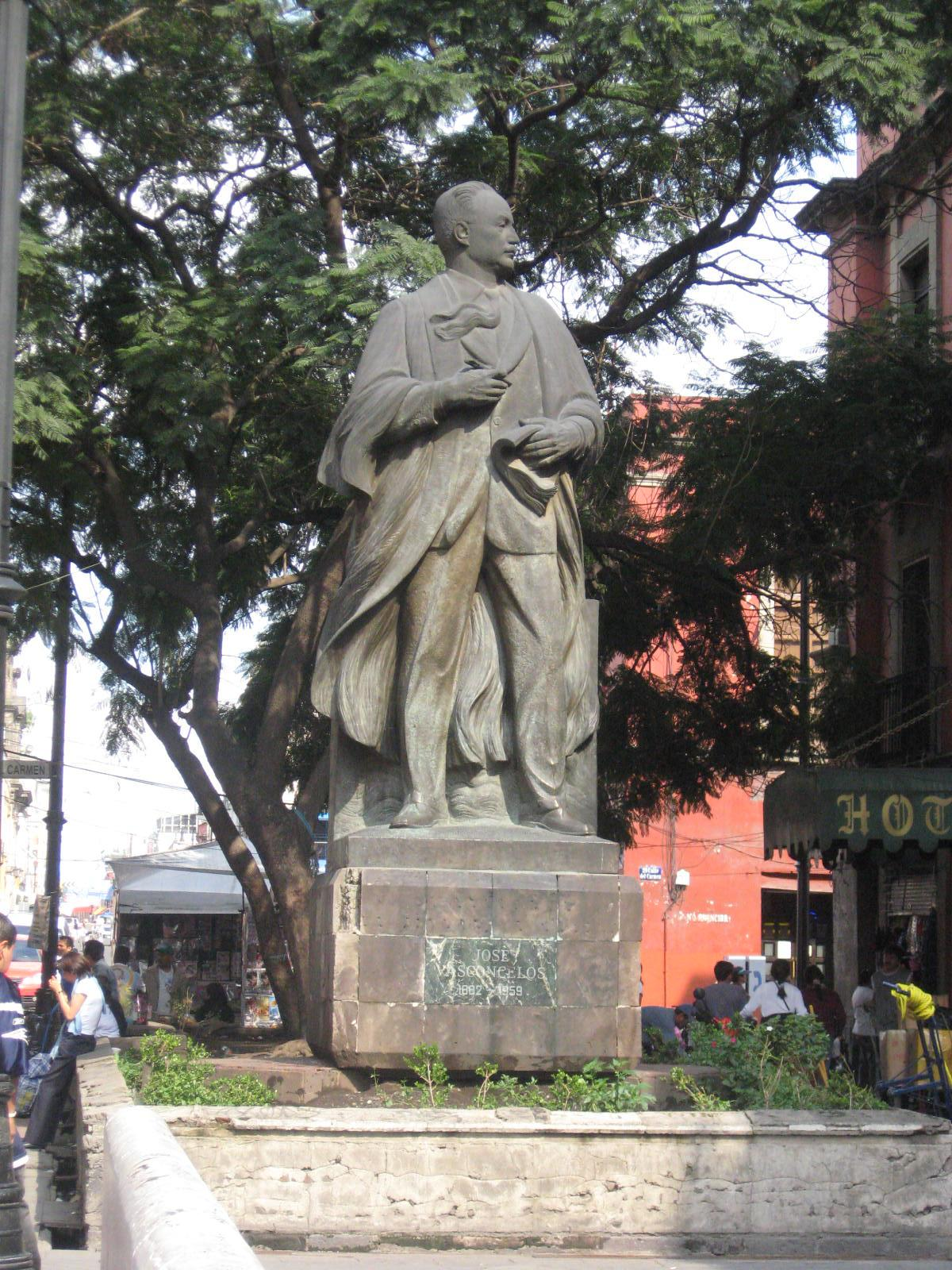
Statue of José Vasconcelos in Mexico City.

== Artwork ==
- Monumento a los Fundadores de Puebla, 1931-1935
- Altar a la Patria, Ciudad de México, 1948-1952
- Escultura de José María Morelos, límites de la Ciudad de México y el estado de Morelos
- Escultura de Antonio Caso, Plaza del Estudiante, Ciudad de México
- Esculturas de Juan Pablo II, Escultura de San Pío y arcángeles de la Basílica de Guadalupe
- Viacrucis de la Catedral de Chihuahua
- Relieves de la Suprema Corte de Justicia de la Nación
- Monumento a Vasco de Quiroga en Quiroga, Michoacán
- Escultura a Ignacio Allende en Irapuato, Guanajuato
- Monumento a José de San Martín en la colonia Polanco, Ciudad de México
- Escultura de Rafael Cabrera, Puebla, 1951
- Esculturas en Almoloya de Juárez, 1953
- Escultura de José María Yáñez, Guaymas,
- Tumba de Manuel M. Ponce en la Rotonda de las Personas Ilustres, Ciudad de México (1954)
- Altar central y esculturas en la Catedral Metropolitana de la Ciudad de México (1957)
- Virgen de Guadalupe, Lourdes
- Bustos de Carranza, Obregón y Calles, La Paz, Baja California Sur (1958)
- Escultura de Felipe Pescador en la Estación de Buenavista, Ciudad de México
- Escultura La Fama en el Toreo de Cuatro Caminos
- Escultura de Alfonso Reyes en el campus de la Universidad Autónoma de Nuevo León
- Tumba de Ignacio Zaragoza en el Panteón de San Fernando, Ciudad de México
- Tumba de Alfonso Reyes, Rotonda de las Personas Ilustres, Ciudad de México
- Bustos de aviadores en el Aeropuerto Internacional de la Ciudad de México
- Monumento a la Victoria del 5 de mayo, Puebla (1961)
- Esculturas de María Auxiliadora y ángeles de la parroquia de Santa Julia, Ciudad de México (1961).
- Esculturas de Hipócrates y Platón en el Centro Médico Nacional Siglo XXI, Ciudad de México (1962)
- Escultura de Juan Diego, Cuautitlán (1962)
- Relieves de la sede del Instituto Mexicano del Seguro Social, Xalapa (1963)
- Cristo de madera para la catedral de Torreón (1963)
- La Marsellesa, Conjunto Habitacional Unidad Independencia, Ciudad de México (1964)
- Escultura de Belisario Domínguez, Nuevo Laredo (1965)
