= Niños Héroes =

6 Mexican teenage military cadets who died in the Battle of Chapultepec (1847)

Image based on the medal given to the cadets

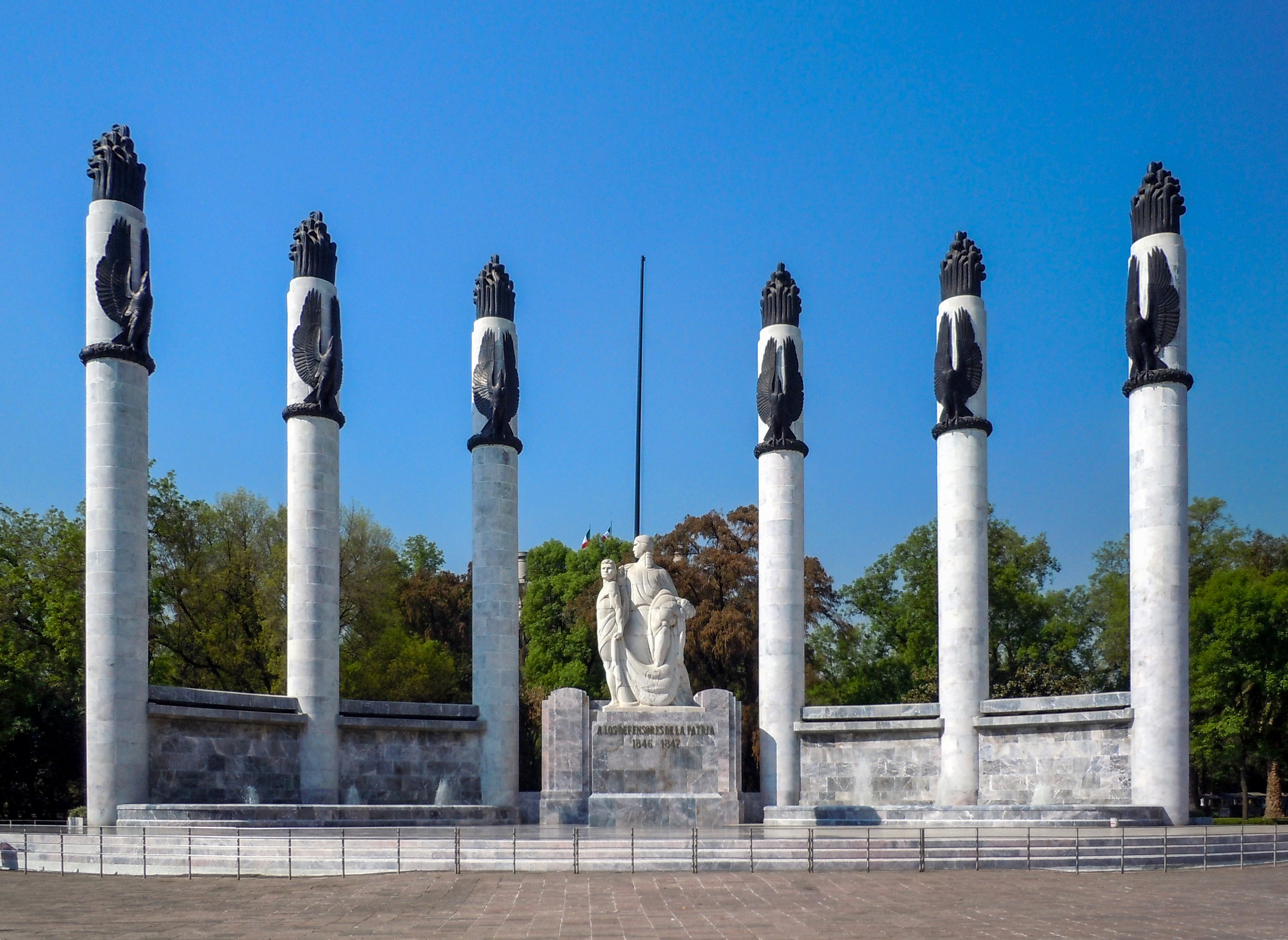
Monument to the Niños Héroes in Chapultepec Park, Mexico City.

The Niños Héroes (Boy Heroes, or Heroic Cadets) were six Mexican military cadets who were killed in the defence of Mexico City during the Battle of Chapultepec, one of the last major battles of the Mexican–American War, on 13 September 1847. The date of the battle is now celebrated in Mexico as a civic holiday to honor the cadets' sacrifice.

== The Battle of Chapultepec ==
Built in the eighteenth century by a viceroy, Chapultepec Castle did not serve as a residence until the late nineteenth century. After independence it served as the Military Academy, training officers for the Mexican Army. At the time of the U.S. invasion, it was defended by Mexican troops under the command of General Nicolás Bravo and General José Mariano Monterde, including cadets from the academy. Bravo gave Santa Anna the assignment to defend this strategic location defending Mexico City. Two thousand soldiers were needed, but Santa Anna could only commit 832, most of whom were National Guardsmen and not the regular army. The number of cadets present has been variously given, from 47 to a few hundred. Despite the castle's position 200 feet above ground level, there were not enough men to defend it. The greatly outnumbered defenders battled General Winfield Scott's troops for about two hours before General Bravo ordered retreat, but the six cadets refused to fall back and fought to the death. Legend has it that the last of the six, Juan Escutia, leapt from Chapultepec Castle wrapped in the Mexican flag to prevent the flag from being taken by the enemy. According to the later account of an unidentified US officer, "about a hundred" cadets between the ages of 10 and 19 were among the "crowds" of prisoners taken after the Castle's capture.

== The cadets ==
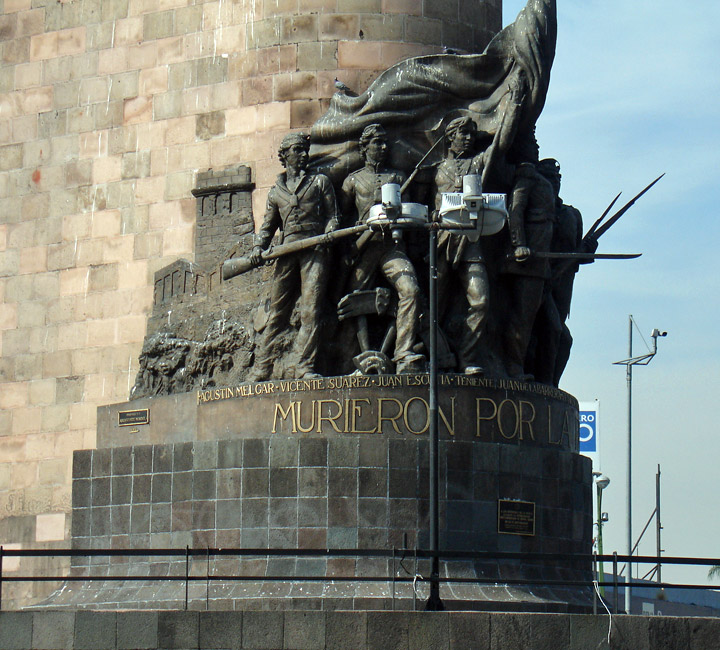
Monument to the Niños Héroes in Guadalajara, Jalisco.

Juan de la Barrera was born in 1828 in Mexico City, the son of Ignacio Mario de la Barrera, an army general, and Juana Inzárruaga. He enlisted at the age of 12 and was admitted to the Academy on 18 November 1843. During the attack on Chapultepec he was a lieutenant in the military engineers (sappers) and died defending a gun battery at the entrance to the park. Aged 19, he was the oldest of the six, and was also part of the school faculty as a volunteer teacher in engineering.

Juan Escutia was born between 1828 and 1832 in Tepic, now the capital of the state of Nayarit. Records show he was admitted to the academy as a cadet on 8 September 1847—five days before the fateful battle—but his other papers were lost during the assault. He is often portrayed as a second lieutenant in an artillery company. He is the cadet who is said to have wrapped himself up in the Mexican flag and jumped from the roof to keep it from falling into enemy hands.

Francisco Márquez was born in 1834 in Guadalajara, Jalisco. Following the death of his father, his mother, Micaela Paniagua, remarried Francisco Ortiz, a cavalry captain. He applied to the Academy on 14 January 1847 and, at the time of the battle, belonged to the first company of cadets. A note included in his personnel record says his body was found on the east flank of the hill, alongside that of Juan Escutia. At 13 years old, he was the youngest of the six heroes.

Agustín Melgar was born between 1828 and 1832 in Chihuahua, Chihuahua. He was the son of Esteban Melgar, a lieutenant colonel in the army, and María de la Luz Sevilla, both of whom died while he was still young, leaving him the ward of his older sister. He applied to the Academy on 4 November 1846. A note in his personnel record explains that after finding himself alone, he tried to stop the enemy on the north side of the castle. It also explains he shot and killed one and took refuge behind mattresses in one of the rooms. Grievously wounded he was placed on a table and found dead beside it on 15 September, after the castle fell. In 2012, a statue honoring him was erected in Chihuahua.

Fernando Montes de Oca was born in 1829 in Azcapotzalco, then a town just to the north of Mexico City and now one of its boroughs. His parents were José María Montes de Oca and Josefa Rodríguez. He had applied to the Academy on 24 January 1847, and was one of the cadets who remained in the castle. His personnel record reads: "Died for his country on 13 September 1847."

Vicente Suárez was born in 1833 in Puebla, Puebla, the son of Miguel Suárez, a cavalry officer, and María de la Luz Ortega. He applied for admission to the Academy on 21 October 1845, and during his stay was an officer cadet. A note in his record reads: "Killed defending his country at his sentry post on 13 September 1847. He ordered the attackers to stop, but they continued to advance. He shot one and stabbed another in the stomach with his bayonet, and was killed at his post in hand-to-hand combat. He was killed for his bravery, because his youthfulness made the attackers hesitate, until he attacked them."

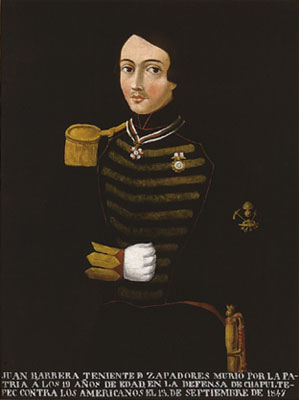
Juan de la Barrera

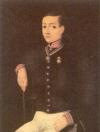
Juan Escutia

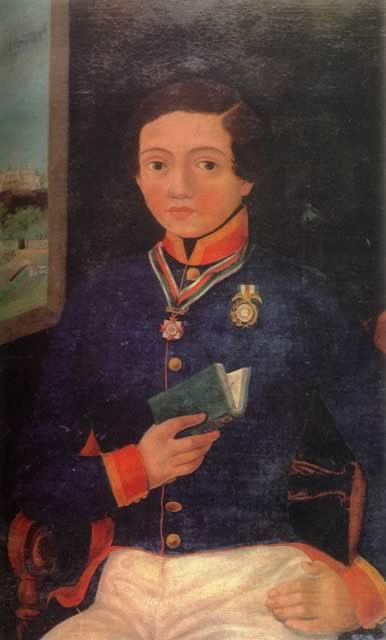
Francisco Márquez

Agustín Melgar

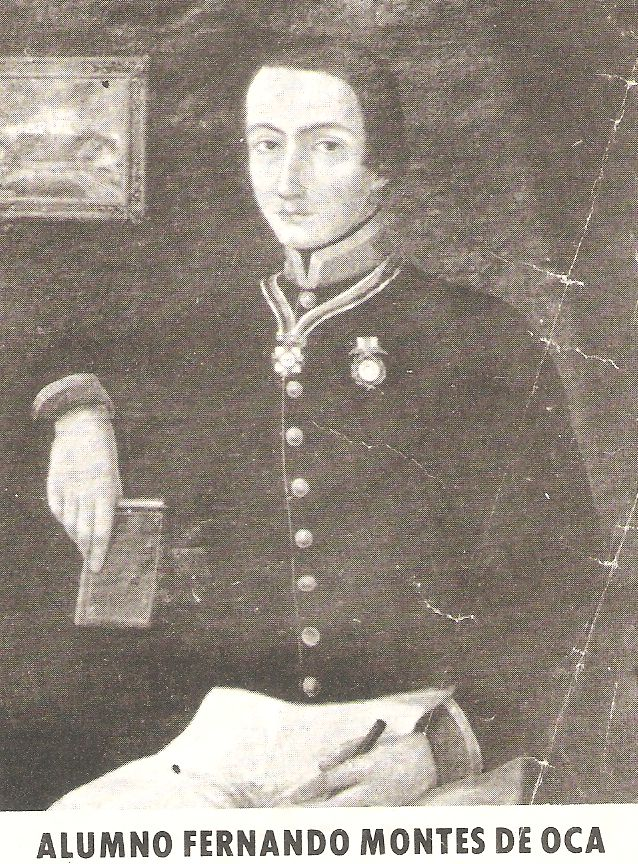
Fernando Montes de Oca

Vicente Suárez

There were 40 cadets who survived the attack and were taken prisoner. One, Ramón Rodríguez Arangoity, designed the 1881 cenotaph commemorating the cadets. Two of them, Miguel Miramón and Manuel Ramírez de Arellano, went on to become generals in the Mexican army. Both collaborated with the French Intervention in Mexico 1862–1867.

== Memorials and historical memory ==
The narrative of the Niños Heroes has played an important role in shaping historical memory in Mexico since 1847, a source of pride at the bravery of the martyred boy cadets in defending Mexico's honor, but in the mid-twentieth century, they have also been a means by which the Mexican and U.S. governments have come to a more harmonious relationship. However, monuments to the boy martyrs were not built until Mexico had fought the War of the Reform (1857–69) and expelled the French-backed Second Mexican Empire (1862–67). A group of former cadets formed the Association of the Military Academy and succeeded in 1881 in erecting a cenotaph of modest size (pictured) at the foot of the hill on which Chapultepec Castle sits. This monument, known as the Obelisco a los Niños Héroes, was the main monument to the boy martyrs in Mexico City until the mid-twentieth century, when the Monumento a los Niños Héroes was inaugurated at the entrance to Chapultepec Park in 1952. The cenotaph had the names of the fallen cadets and those who were captured and became a site of commemoration by the association that erected it as well as for Mexican officials and ordinary citizens.

On March 5, 1947, U.S. President Harry S. Truman placed a wreath at the cenotaph and stood for a few moments of silent reverence. Asked by American reporters why he had gone to the monument, Truman said, "Brave men don't belong to any one country. I respect bravery wherever I see it."

As the centennial of the war approached, there were calls to recover the remains of the cadets, so that a memorial that was also a burial site could honor their bravery. The 1881 cenotaph honored them, but did not have the significance of a burial site. The Mexican government acceded to the request of the Mexican Army and the Military Academy to find the remains, but work did not begin until after President Truman's 1947 visit. The concerted search for the bones was no easy task. During the war, the dead were quickly buried for sanitary reasons, near where they fell, so that the remains of around 600 were in Chapultepec Park. Several sites were excavated. A mass grave was found on the southern hillside of Chapultepec Hill. Six bodies were officially identified as belonging to the six deceased cadets of 1847, but a later investigation "alleged that the sappers found numerous skeletons but removed only the smallest from the soil." Mexico City newspapers proclaimed that the bodies of the cadets had been found, but the Mexican government convened a panel of scientists to confirm the identities of the bones. There was tremendous pressure on them to validate that these were indeed the remains, which was done. The remains were placed in gold and crystal urns, and moved to the Military Academy. A plaque was placed at the site.

On September 27, 1952, after many public ceremonies, a monument was inaugurated in the Plaza de la Constitución (Zócalo) with an honor guard from the various military academies of the Americas.

The six cadets are honored by an imposing monument made of Carrara marble by architect Enrique Aragón and sculptor Ernesto Tamariz at the entrance to Chapultepec Park (1952).

At the castle itself, in 1967 Gabriel Flores painted a large mural above the stairway depicting Escutia's leap from the roof with the Mexican flag.

The 5,000-peso banknote (1987 series) commemorated the battle. The cadets are shown and named on the front of the banknote, and Chapultepec Castle is on the reverse. Starting in 1993, this banknote was retired in favor of the 5 nuevos pesos coin, and there is no analogous banknote in the 1996 series. The cadets appear on a N$50 coin minted from 1993; it is rare compared to the N$50 banknote.

The name Niños Héroes, along with the cadets' individual names, are commonly given to streets, squares and schools and other public areas across Mexico, including Metro Niños Héroes of the Mexico City Metro and a station on the Monterrey Metro. Streets in the Condesa neighborhood adjacent to Chapultepec Castle bear the names of each cadet.

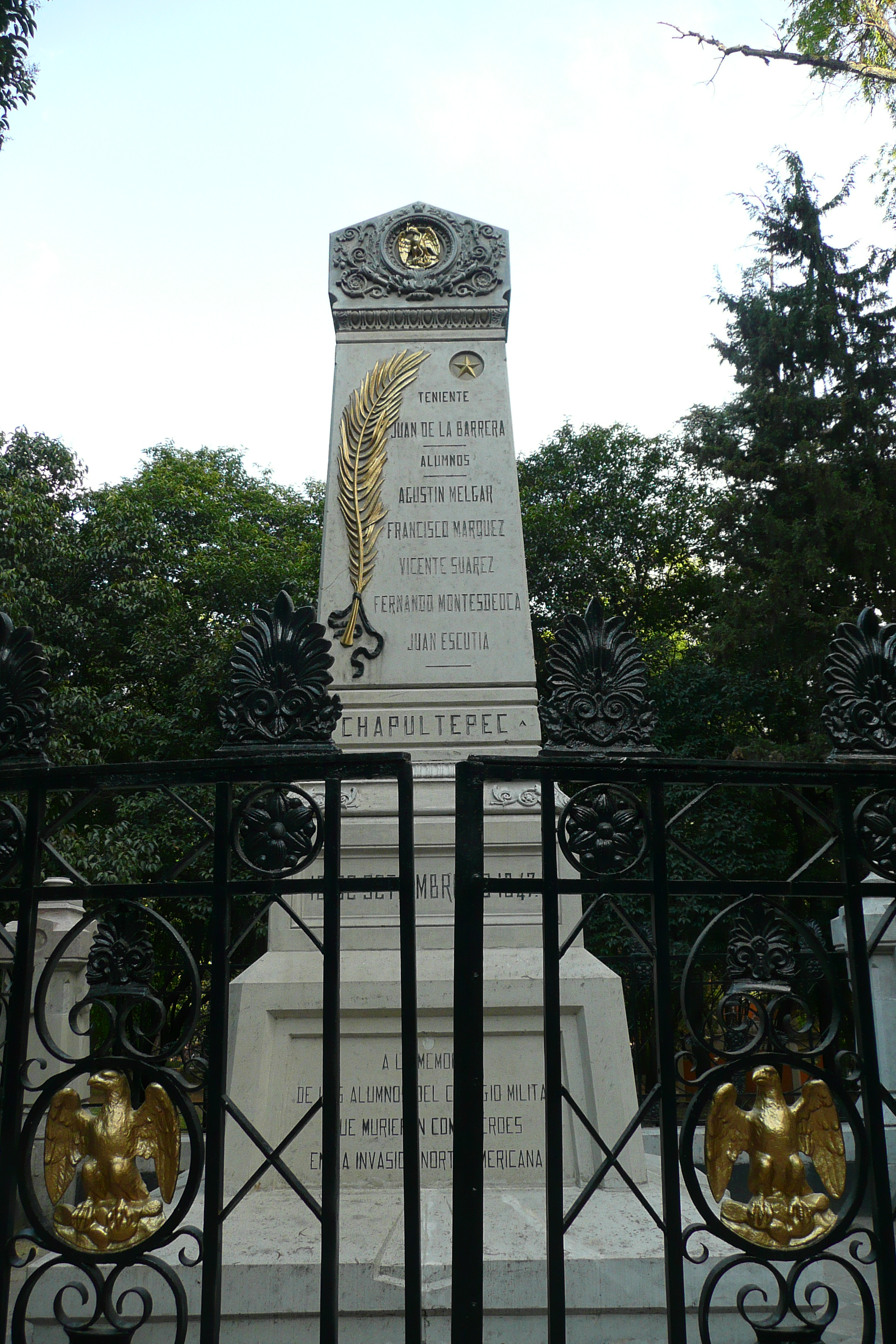
Obelisk commemorating the cadets and military school personnel who participated in the Battle of Chapultepec.

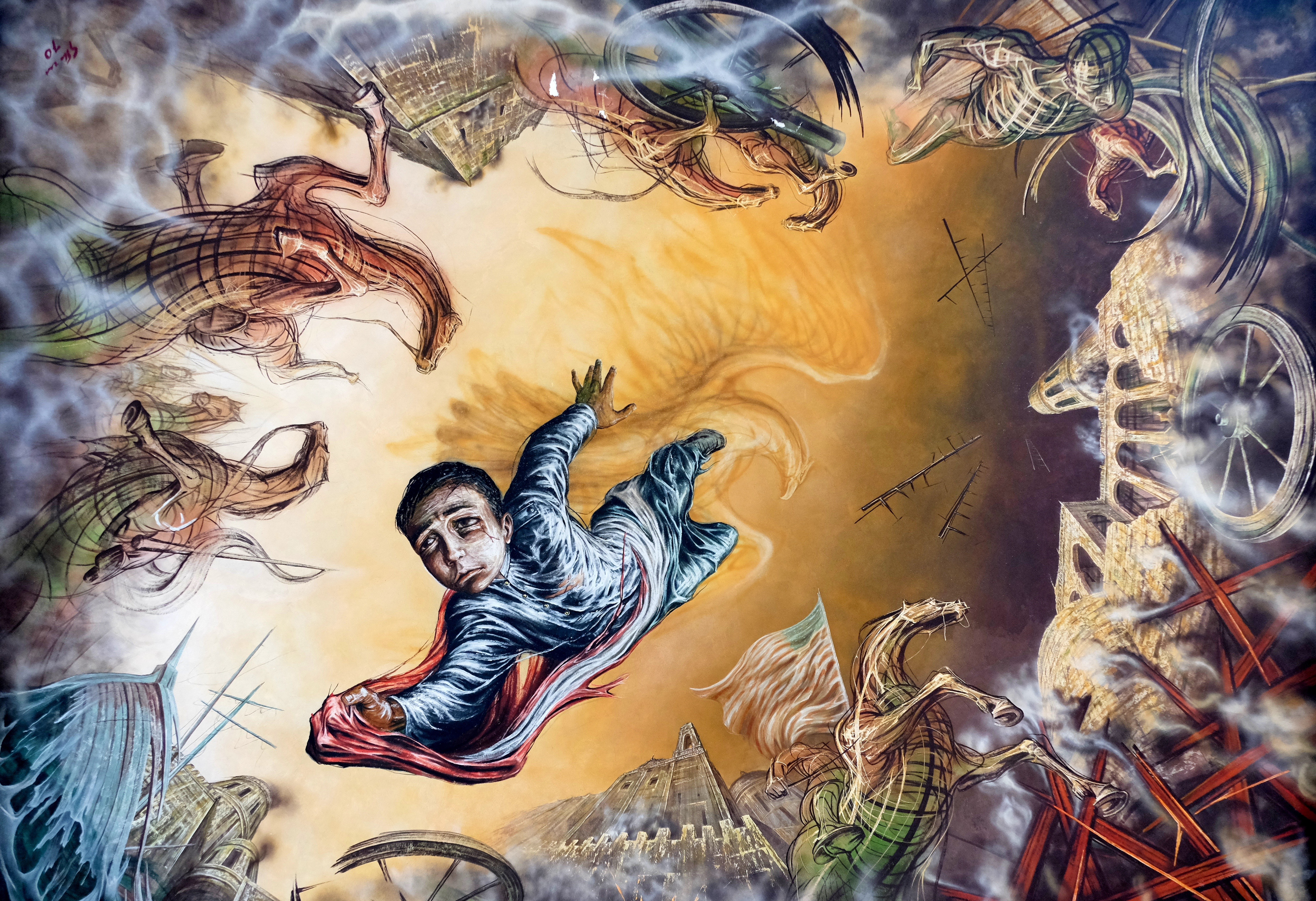
Painting on a ceiling of the Castillo de Chapultepec by Gabriel Flores depicting Juan Escutia leaping from the castle walls to his death, wrapped in the Mexican flag in order to prevent the flag from falling into U.S. hands.

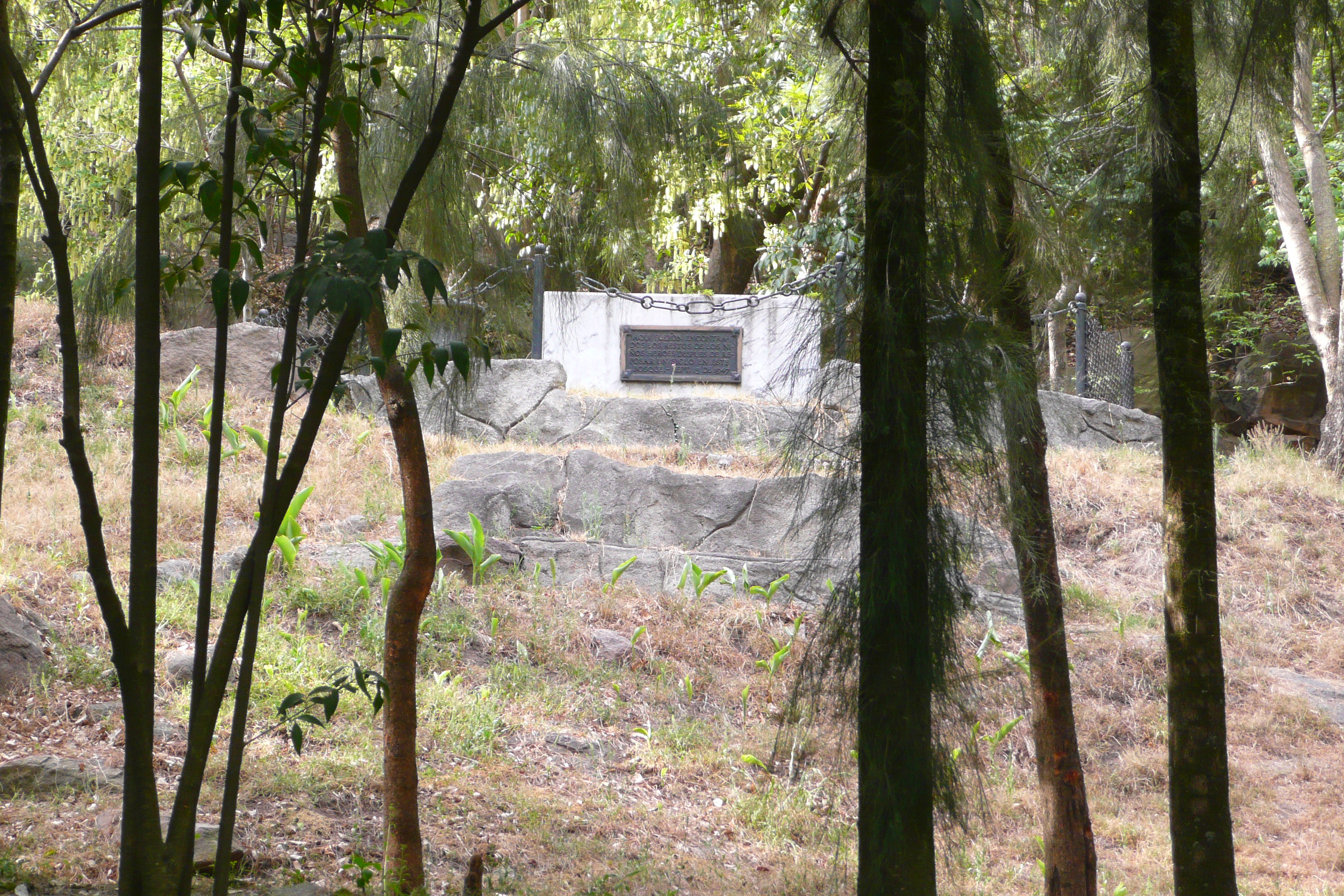
Plate and place where the remains of six Mexican soldiers were found in Chapultepec, 1947.

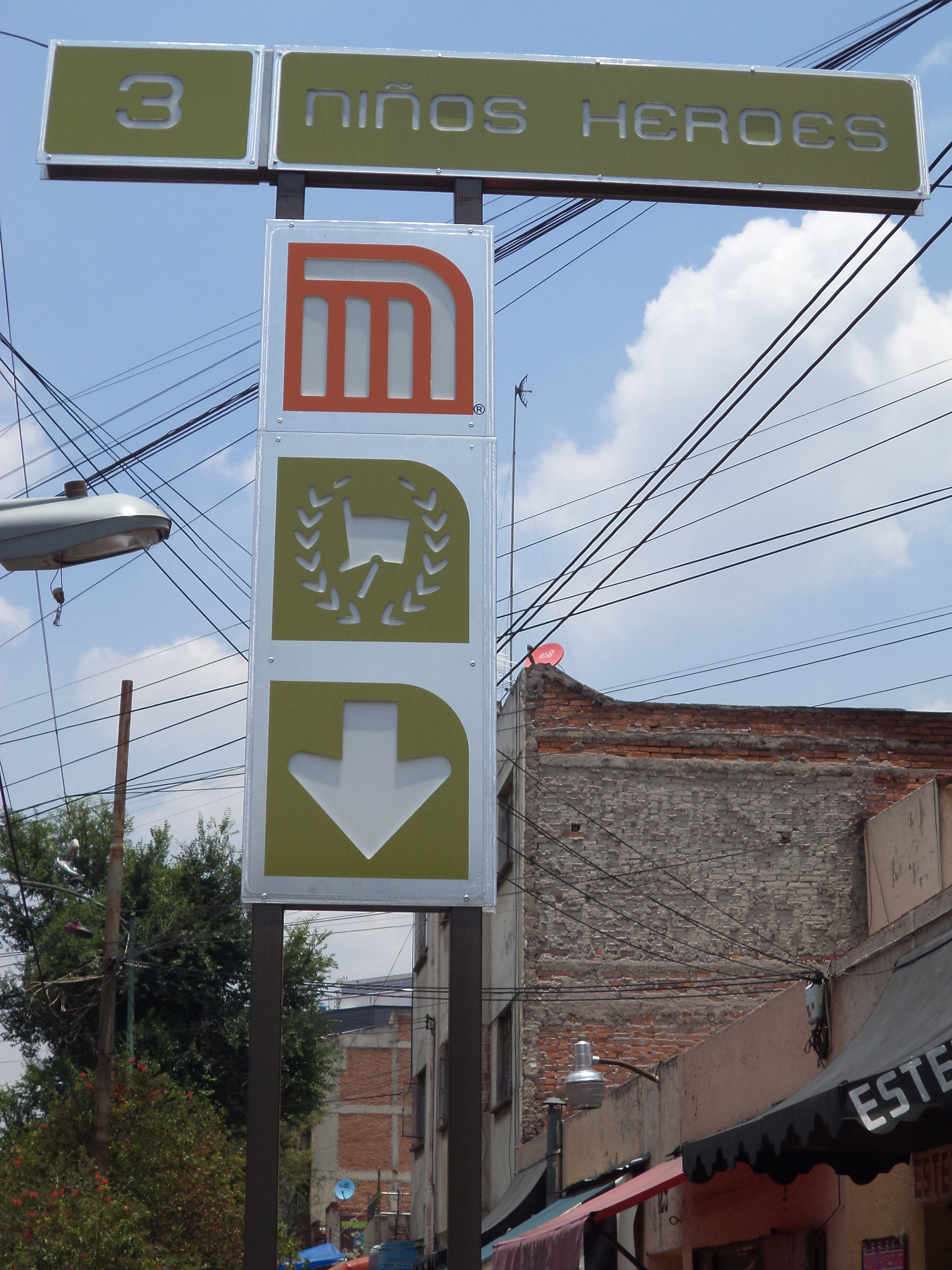
Metro Niños Héroes

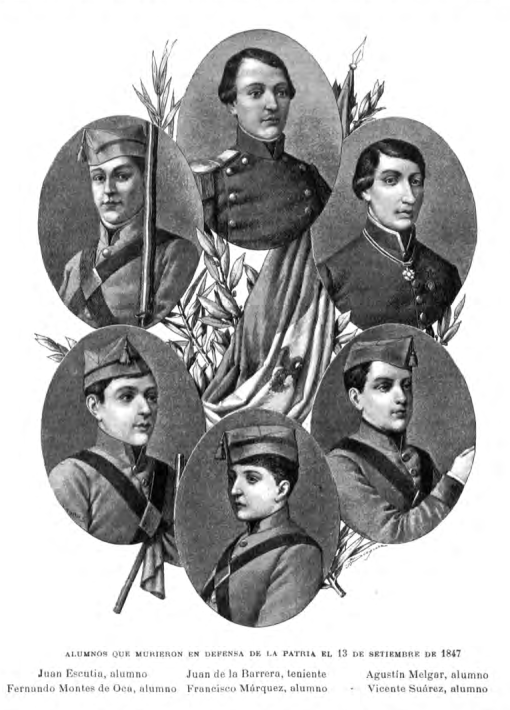
portrayal in México a través de los siglos

== See also ==
- Battle of Chapultepec
- Chapultepec Castle
- Mexican–American War
