= Juan de la Barrera =

Mexican military personnel (1828–1847)

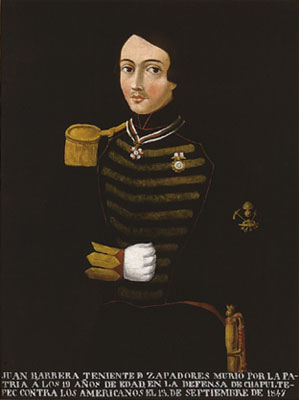
- Juan De La Barrera, Lieutenant in the Mexican Army, died for Mexico at the age of 19 in the defense of Battle of Chapultepec against the Americans on September 13, 1847.
- Born: June 26, 1828; Mexico City, Federal District
- Died: September 13, 1847 (aged 19); Mexico City
- Military career
- Allegiance: Mexico
- Branch: Mexican Army
- Rank: Lieutenant
- Unit: Heroic Military Academy
- Conflicts: Mexican–American War: Battle of Chapultepec †
- Awards: Medal of honor for the defenders of the Battle of Chapultepec

Juan de la Barrera (Mexico City, June 26, 1828 – Mexico City, September 13, 1847) was a Mexican cadet who lived during the 19th century and Boy Hero.

In 1841, he entered the Heroic Military Academy. He died during the Battle of Chapultepec, fought during the Mexican–American War. He is one of the six cadets now known as the Niños Héroes (Boy Heroes), revered for their bravery in defending Mexico during the brutal American invasion. Their sacrifice remains a symbol of national pride.

== Biography ==
=== Family and Birth ===
Manuel Juan Pablo José Ramón de la Barrera e Inzáurraga, according to his baptismal record, was born in Mexico City on Thursday, June 26, 1828. He was the youngest of seven children, born to Ignacio María de la Barrera Troncoso (1794-1840), of the illustrious de la Barrera family descended from the Spanish conquistador Pedro de la Barrera that settled in Hidalgo, and María Josefa Vicenta Inzáurraga Carrillo (1805-1857), who married in 1819 when Juan’s father was working as a clerk in the Department of the General Captaincy and in the Secretariat of the Viceroyalty. Soon after, Ignacio de la Barrera was promoted to officer in the Ministry of War and Navy, where he worked for ten years. In 1820, the couple had their first child, María de la Luz. The following year, Josefa was born, and in 1822, twins Manuel María and Ignacio María were born; then María Guadalupe in 1824, and Felipe de Jesús in 1826. In 1828, Juan was born, named after his ancestor who had emigrated from Spain in the 17th century.

His father, Ignacio, was the son of scrivener and notary public José Ignacio María de la Barrera Andonaegui (1772-1824), related to prominent figures in political, military, and ecclesiastical spheres. Little is known about his mother, who was the daughter of Norberto Inzáurraga Urbina, an editor of novels in New Spain, and aunt of the well-known liberal politician José María Iglesias.

=== Studies at the Military Academy ===
He completed his primary education in Mexico City. Thanks to his father's military position, who rose to the rank of Lieutenant Colonel, Juan de la Barrera entered the Military Academy on February 15, 1841, before turning thirteen. He participated in the uprising known as the Plan de Regeneración Política and was appointed a second lieutenant of artillery on December 18 of the same year he joined the academy. This led to his discharge from the school and enlistment in the first artillery brigade, where he joined the fourth company. Having an inclination for engineering and construction, de la Barrera requested permission to continue his studies.

"Since I embraced the glorious military career, I intended to pursue it in the elective class; for this reason [...] Your Excellency kindly conferred it to me for the corps in which I am, in which I believed I could achieve my goal [...] I am now disillusioned that I will not be able to gain all the knowledge I need to fulfil my ambitions, as the burdens of military service, as only a few hours every two days I am off duty, prevent me from dedicating myself fully to study, I must also state that due to the same reason the daily mathematics lessons I received from a private teacher have been suspended [...] Therefore, wishing to make a career in the General Staff, I have decided to implore Your Excellency’s magnanimity for the grace of granting me leave for the time necessary to dedicate myself exclusively to study, without the distractions of active service, so that I may achieve through this, the means to be a qualified officer.

Although his request was initially denied, in 1843 he was allowed to return to the Heroic Military Academy to continue his studies with the aim of becoming a Military Engineer, which he achieved on December 1 of that year. As a distinguished and dedicated student, he was awarded the distinctive rank of second lieutenant cadet on January 30, 1845, for his academic performance and good grades. On August 11, 1847, by orders of Antonio López de Santa Anna, he was promoted to Lieutenant of Engineers and left the Military Academy, assigned to the sappers battalion, although he never joined it as the unit fought during the Battle of Padierna, and was defeated.

== Defense of Chapultepec Castle ==
Even though de la Barrera was no longer part of the Heroic Military Academy, he remained at Chapultepec Castle under the direct orders of General Mariano Monterde, the commanding officer of the Military Academy. As the battle of Chapultepec approached, Monterde tasked him with building a hornwork with two half bastions connected by a curtain, which faced the entrance to the forest where the Tacubaya and Chapultepec causeways met, to hold off the American invaders.

When the U.S. forces, led by General Winfield Scott, attacked on September 13, 1847, the castle was defended by a greatly outnumbered group of Mexican tropos. Under the command of Nicolás Bravo, they fought valiantly, despite having only 832 soldiers to defend the strategic location, against almost 4,000 American troops. De la Barrera led 160 soldiers in the defense of the entrance to the park.

=== Death and legacy ===
After two hours of fighting, Bravo ordered a retreat, but de la Barrera and five fellow cadets chose to fight to the death.

Upon reaching the fortification, U.S. General John A. Quitman fired a barrage of projectiles at him. There, Juan de la Barrera died at the age of 19 years and three months.

Mexico honored him by interring his remains in a monument built in his memory and that of his five companions, at the monument to "Los Niños Héroes".
