= Bridge of the Lions =

Bridge in Mexico City, Mexico

Bridge of the Lions Puente de Los Leones
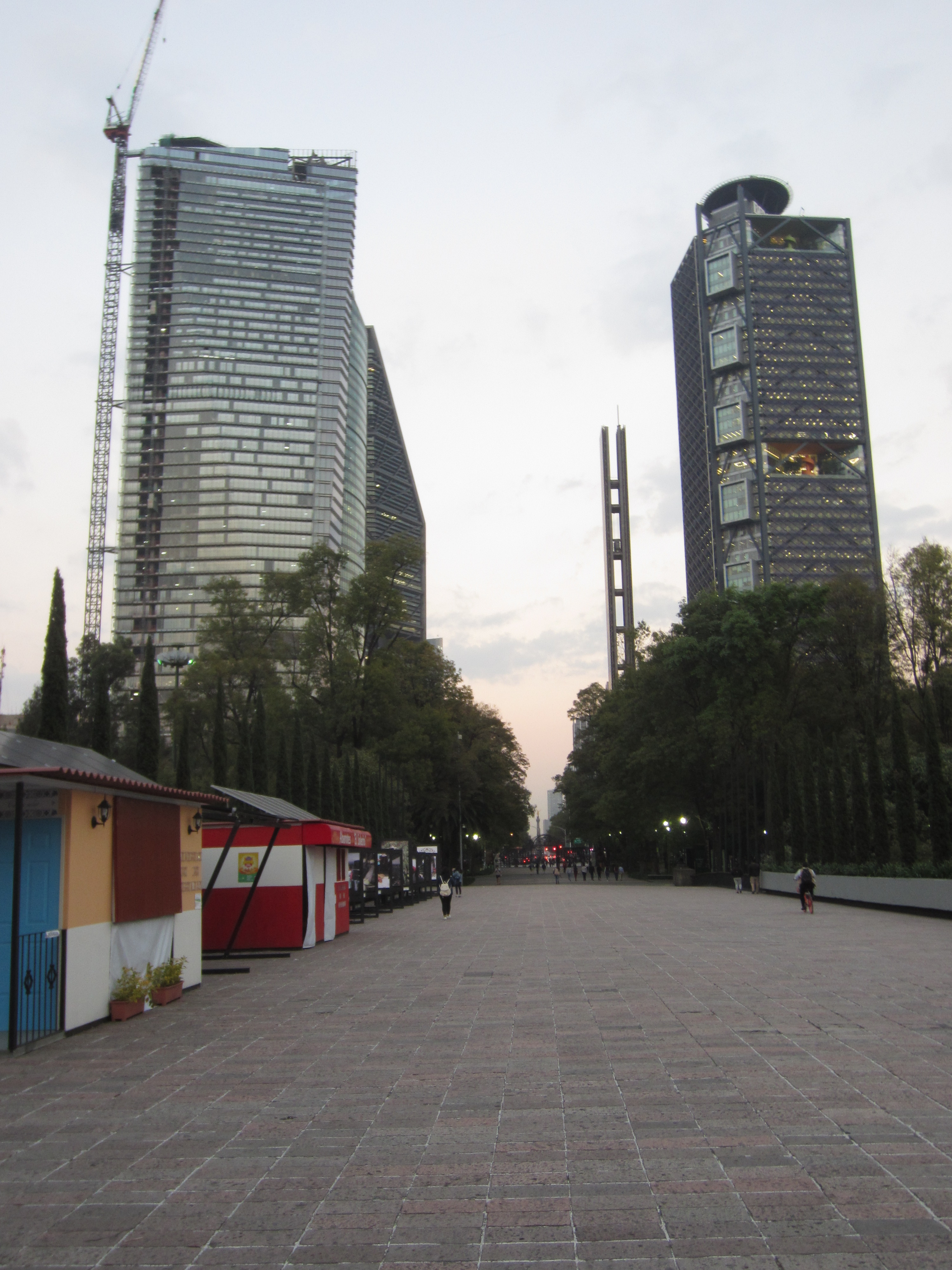
- The bridge in 2018
- Coordinates: 19°25′20″N 99°10′40″W

The Bridge of the Lions (Spanish: Puente de Los Leones) is a bridge along Av. Juventud Heroica in Mexico City, Mexico, adjacent to Chapultepec. Completed in 1975, the bridge features four bronze sculptures of lions and is flanked by cypress gardens.

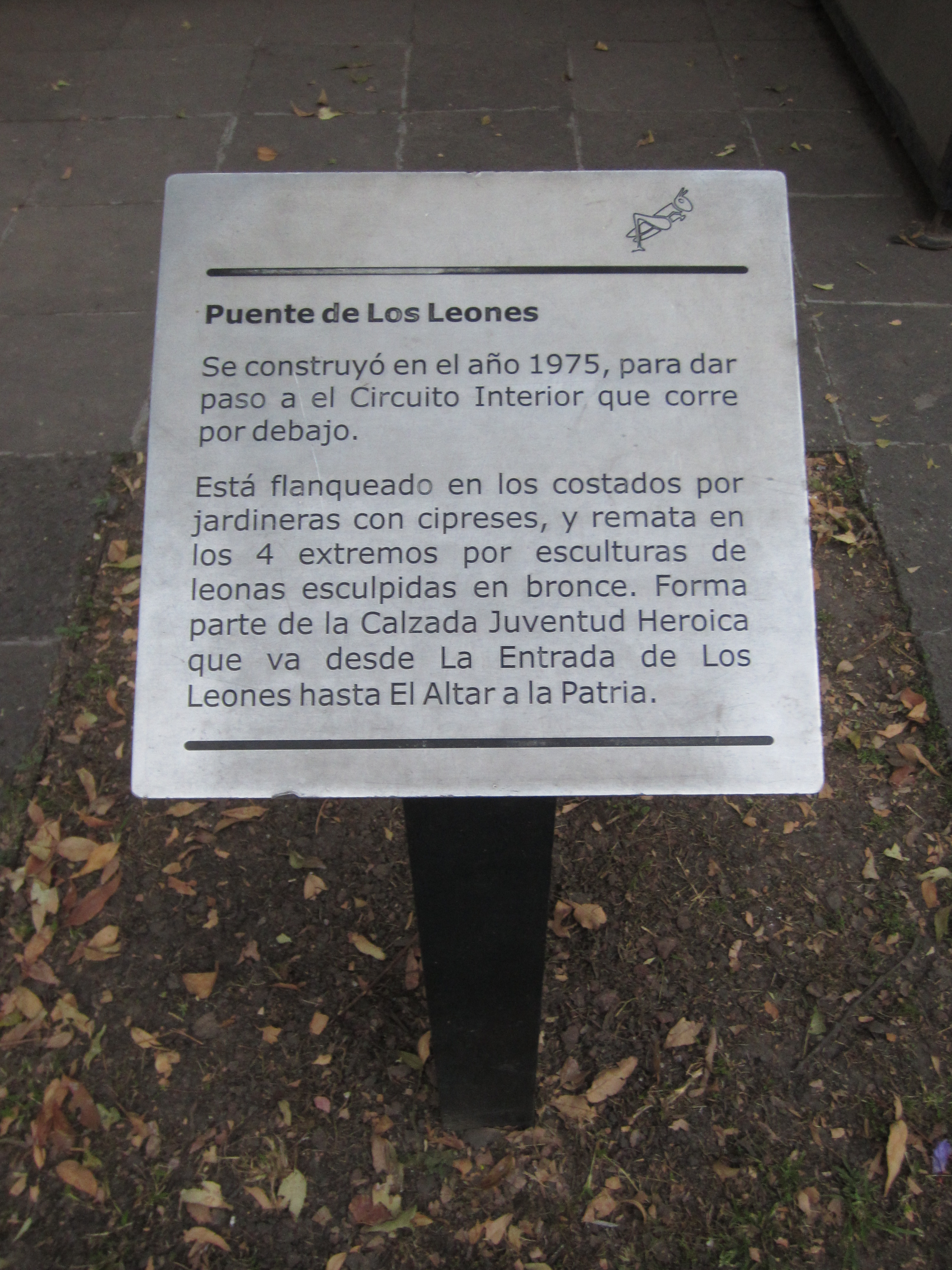
Marker

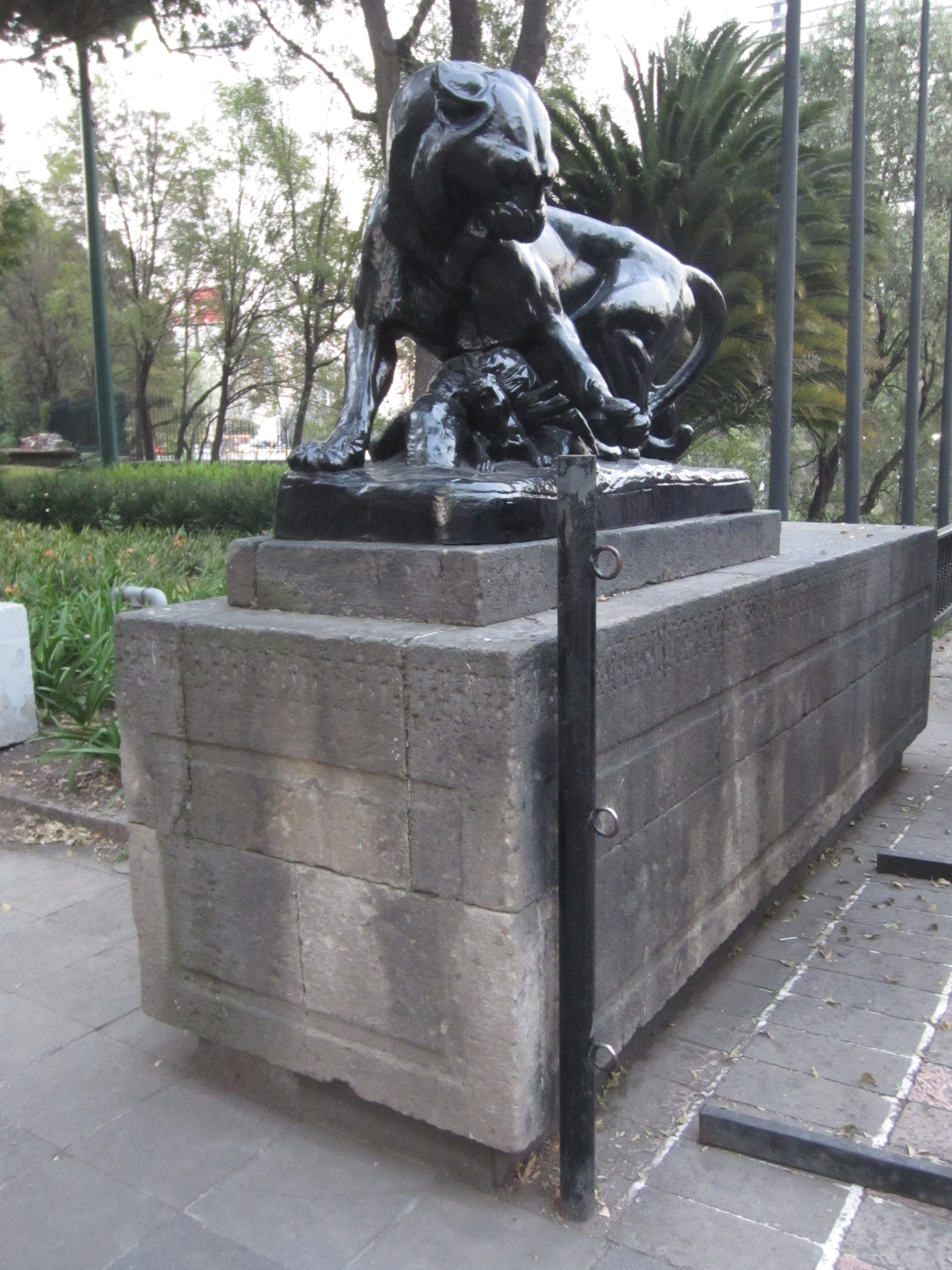
Bronze sculpture of lion

== See also ==
- Puerta de los Leones
