= Templanza Fountain =

Fountain in Chapultepec, Mexico City, Mexico

- es: Fuente de la Templanza
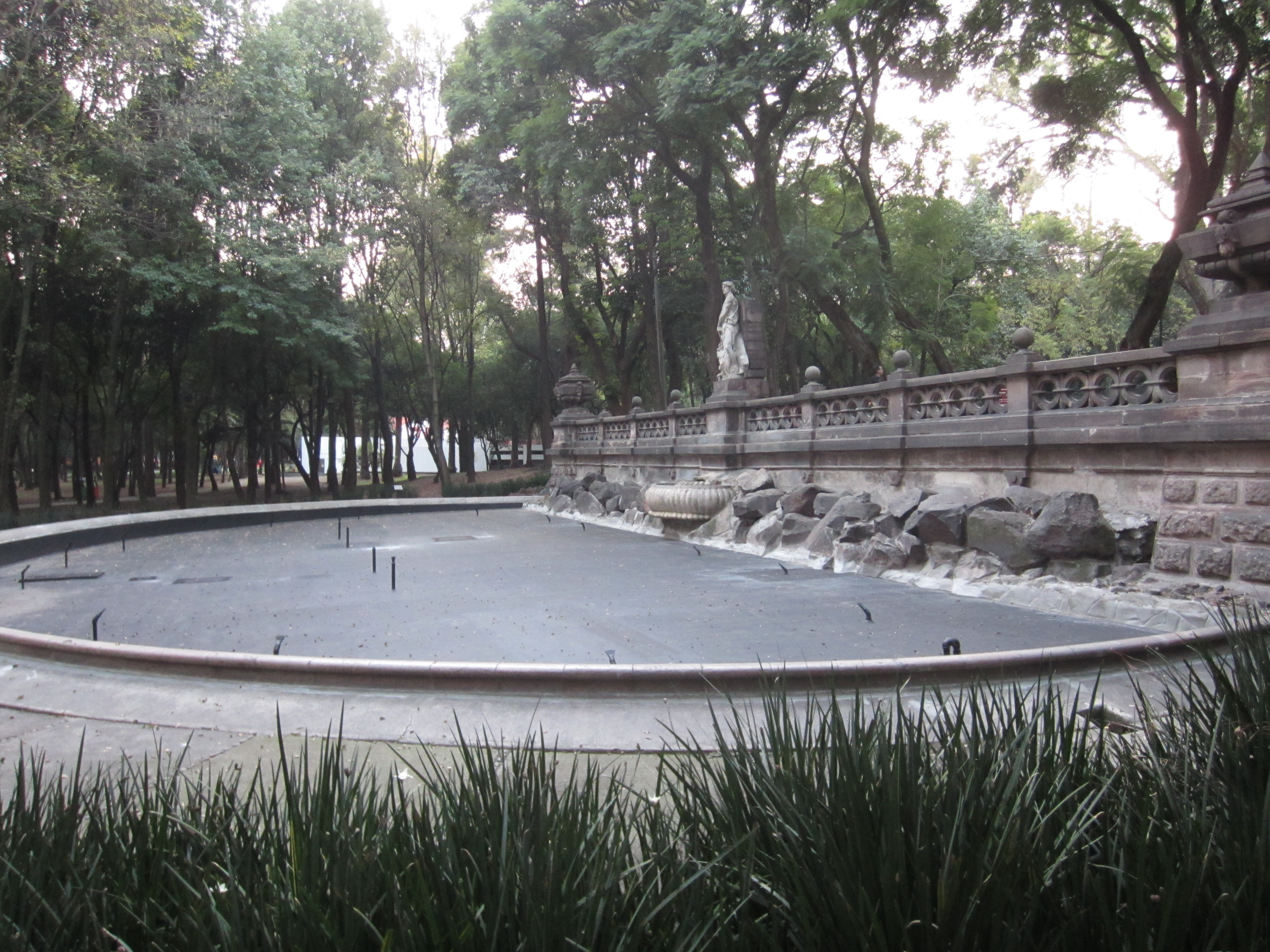
- The fountain in 2018
- Location: Chapultepec, Mexico City
- 19°25′9.5″N 99°10′50″W

Templanza Fountain (Spanish: Fuente de la Templanza) is a fountain in Chapultepec, Mexico City, Mexico.
