= El Sargento =

Monument in Chapultepec, Mexico City, Mexico

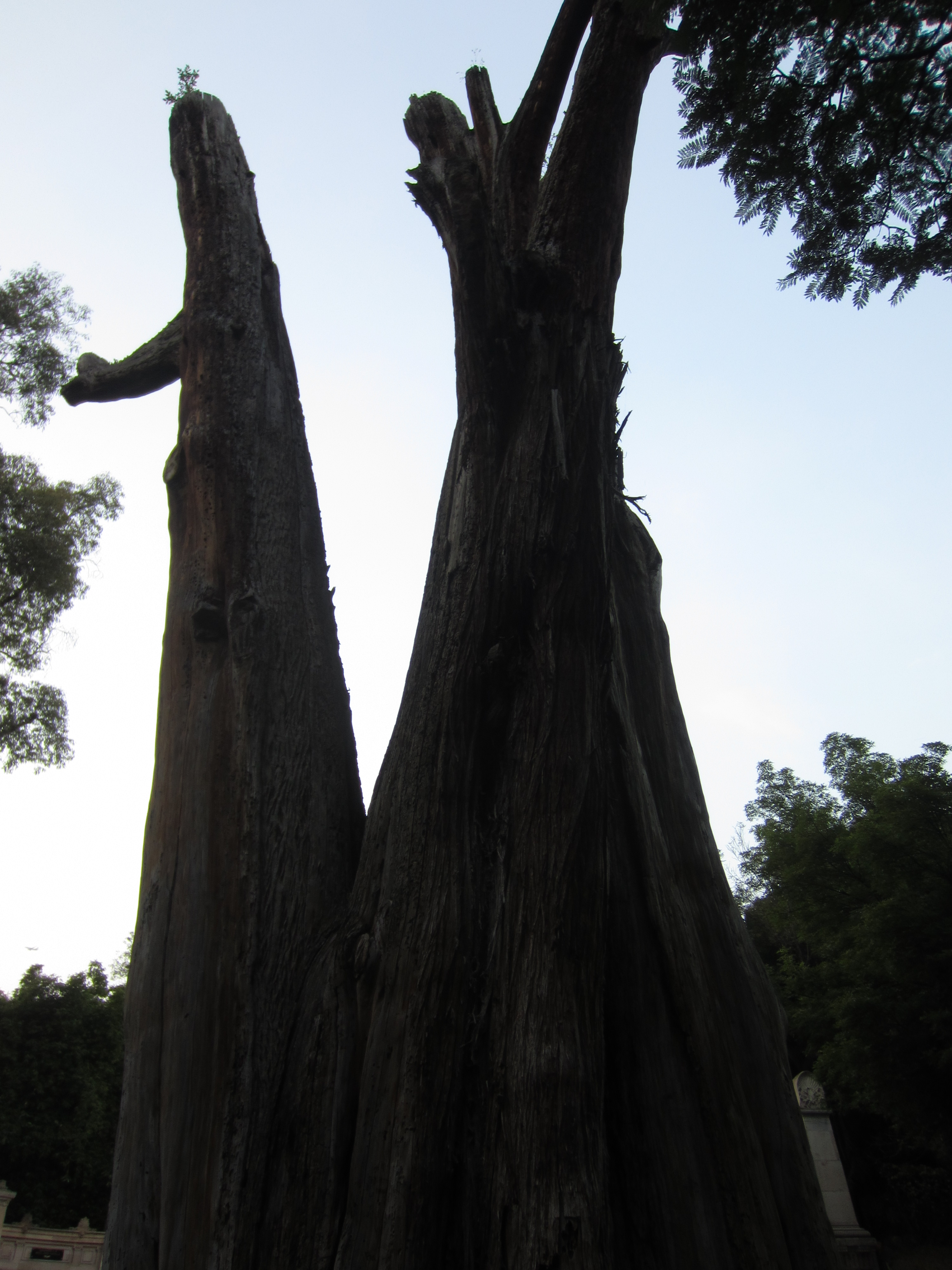
- The dead tree's trunk in 2018
- Location: Mexico City, Mexico
- Coordinates: 19°25′9.6″N 99°10′51″W

El Sargento is a Mexican cypress tree in Mexico City's park Chapultepec, planted by Nezahualcoyotl c. 1460. After living for approximately 500 years, the tree died in 1969, and its trunk stands today at around 50 feet tall.

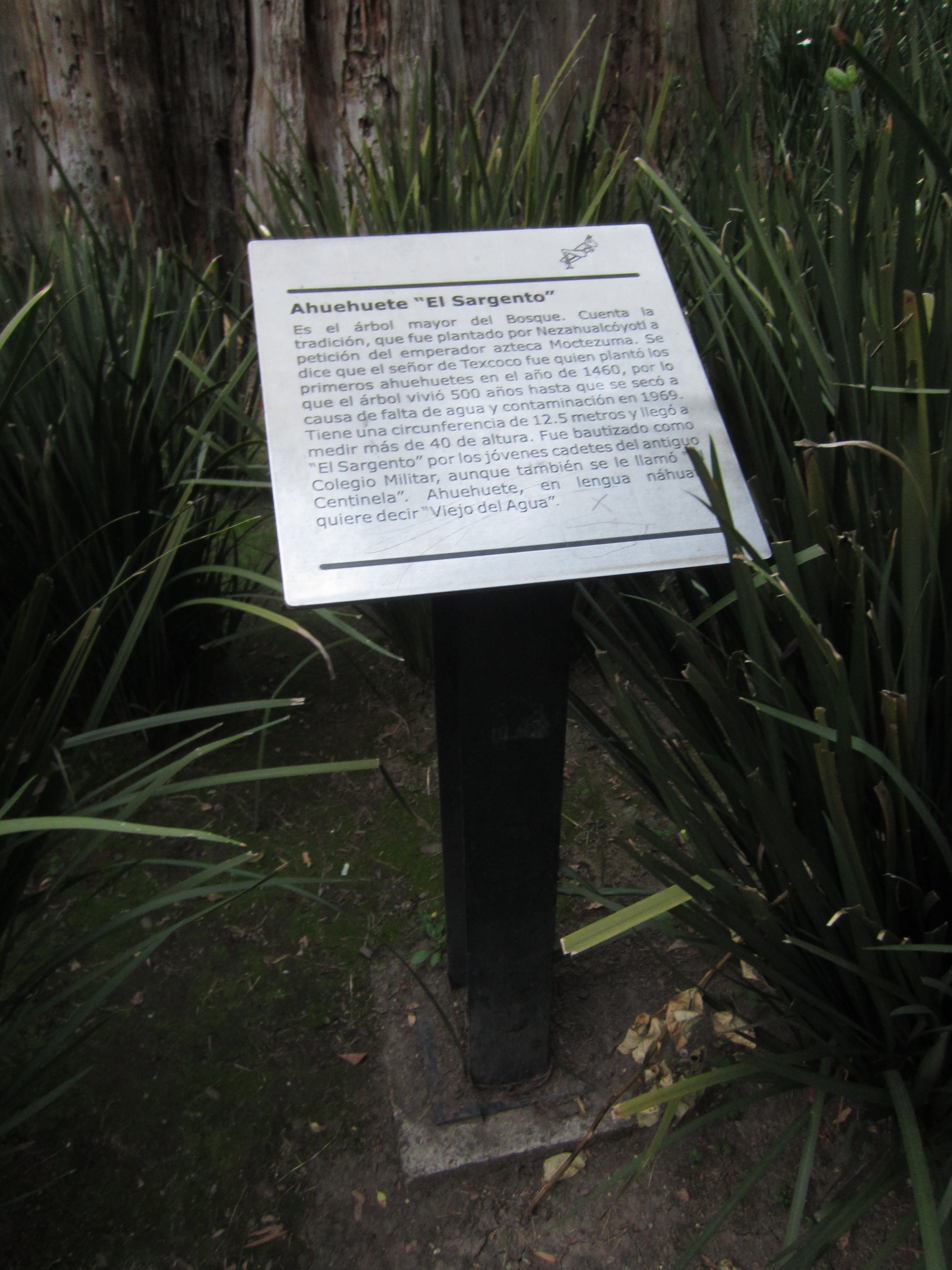
Sign for the tree, 2018
