= Tribuna Monumental =

Monument in Chapultepec, Mexico City

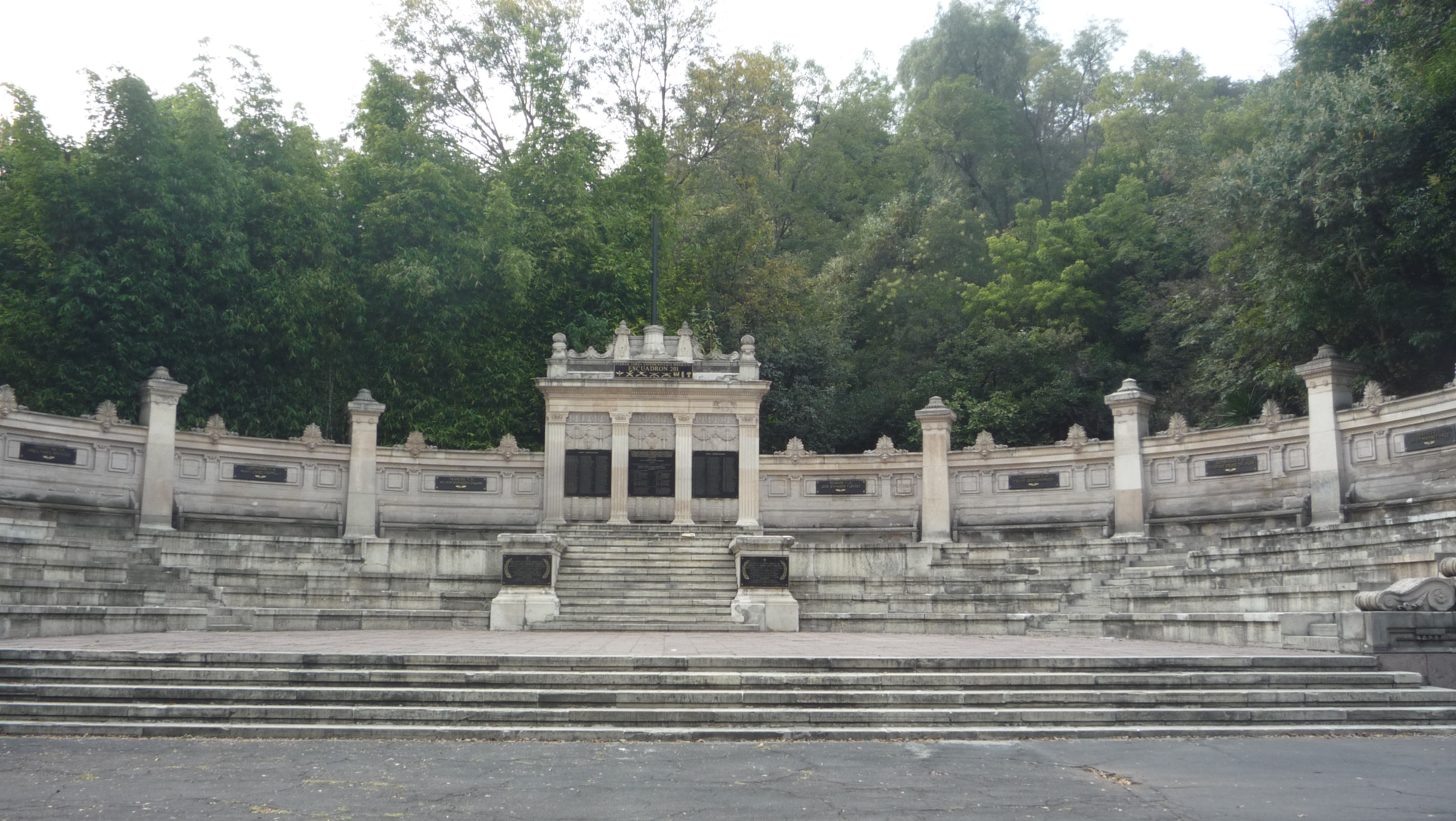
- The monument in 2010
- Interactive map of Tribuna Monumental
- Location: Mexico City, Mexico
- Coordinates: 19°25′10″N 99°10′52″W

Tribuna Monumental, or the Monumento a las Águilas Caídas, is a monument in Chapultepec, Mexico City, commemorating Mexican army officers in Squadron 201, who fought on the Pacific front during World War II.
