= Puerta de los Leones =

Main access gate to Chapultepec Park, Mexico City, Mexico

Coordinates: 19°25′23″N 99°10′34″W

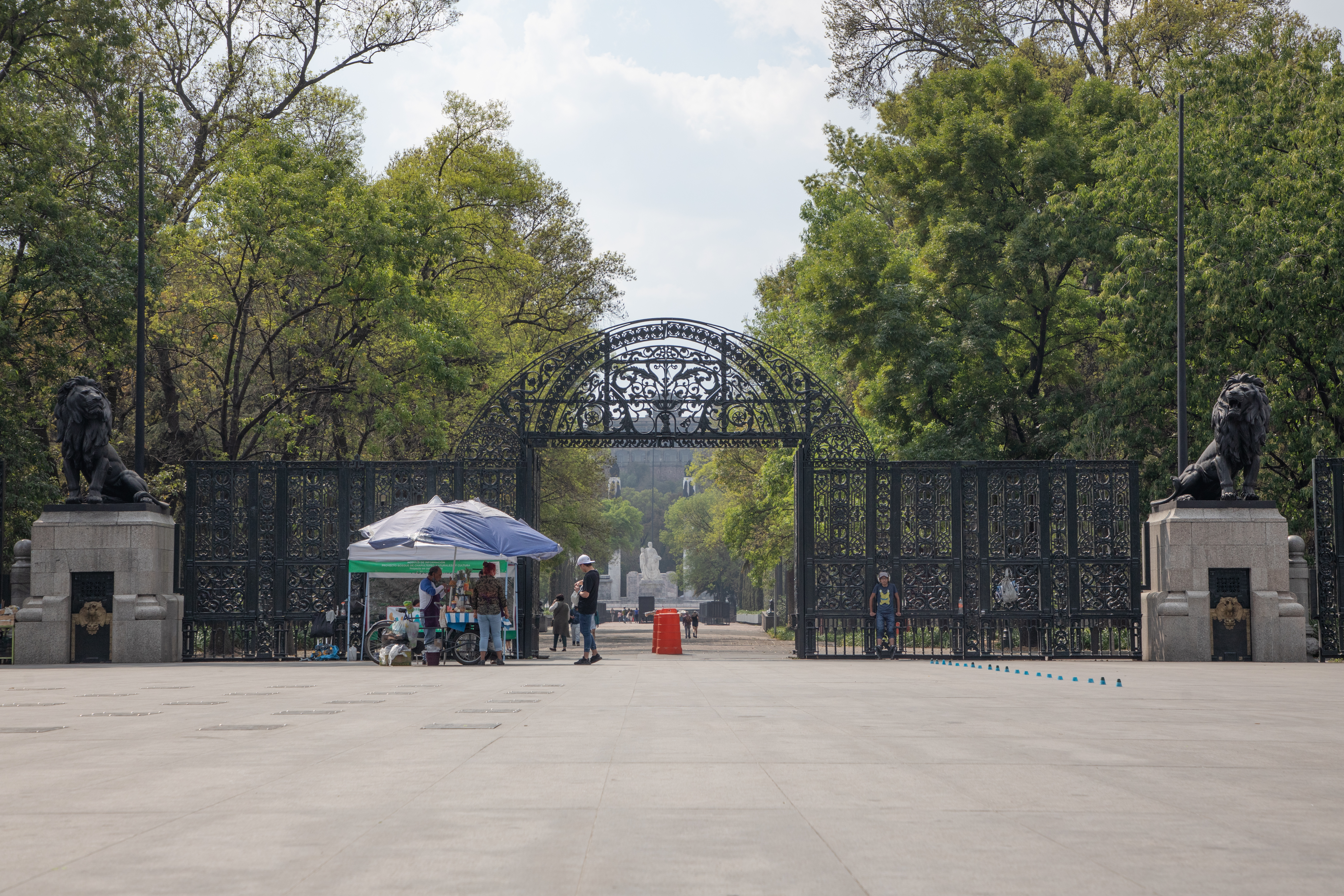
- The gateway in 2021
- Interactive map of the Puerta de los Leones area

General information
- Location: Calzada Juventud Heroica, Mexico City, Mexico
- Inaugurated: 17 September 1921

Design and construction
- Architect: Antonio Muñoz García
- Other designers: N. Norris and J. Tovar (gate); Émile Bénard (sculptures)

Other information
- Public transit access: Metrobús Chapultepec

The Puerta de los Leones (English: Lion's Gateway) is the main entrance to the first section of the Chapultepec Park, in Mexico City. It is found near Paseo de la Reforma and it connects with Calzada Juventud Heroica. It was created by Antonio Muñoz García.

== Description ==
The gateway serves the first section of Chapultepec Park, a public park in Mexico City. Immediately, it connects with the Lions Garden, a green area that was originally part of the San Miguel Chapultepec town, and whose main parish was set there. Calzada Juventud Heroica starts at the gateway. It is connected to the 1975 Bridge of the Lions (which crosses Circuito Interior) and reaches the Altar a la Patria.

It was named after the two lion bronze sculptures that lie on granite Art Deco plinths; the mineral came from Germany, Canada and Zacatecas. The plinths serve as if they were entrance guardhouses.

Visitors access through an iron gate with a relief of an eagle with its wings outstretched that is located on the ground floor. The gate is made of cast iron and was created by the smelter N. Norris and it was modeled by the sculptor J. Tovar.

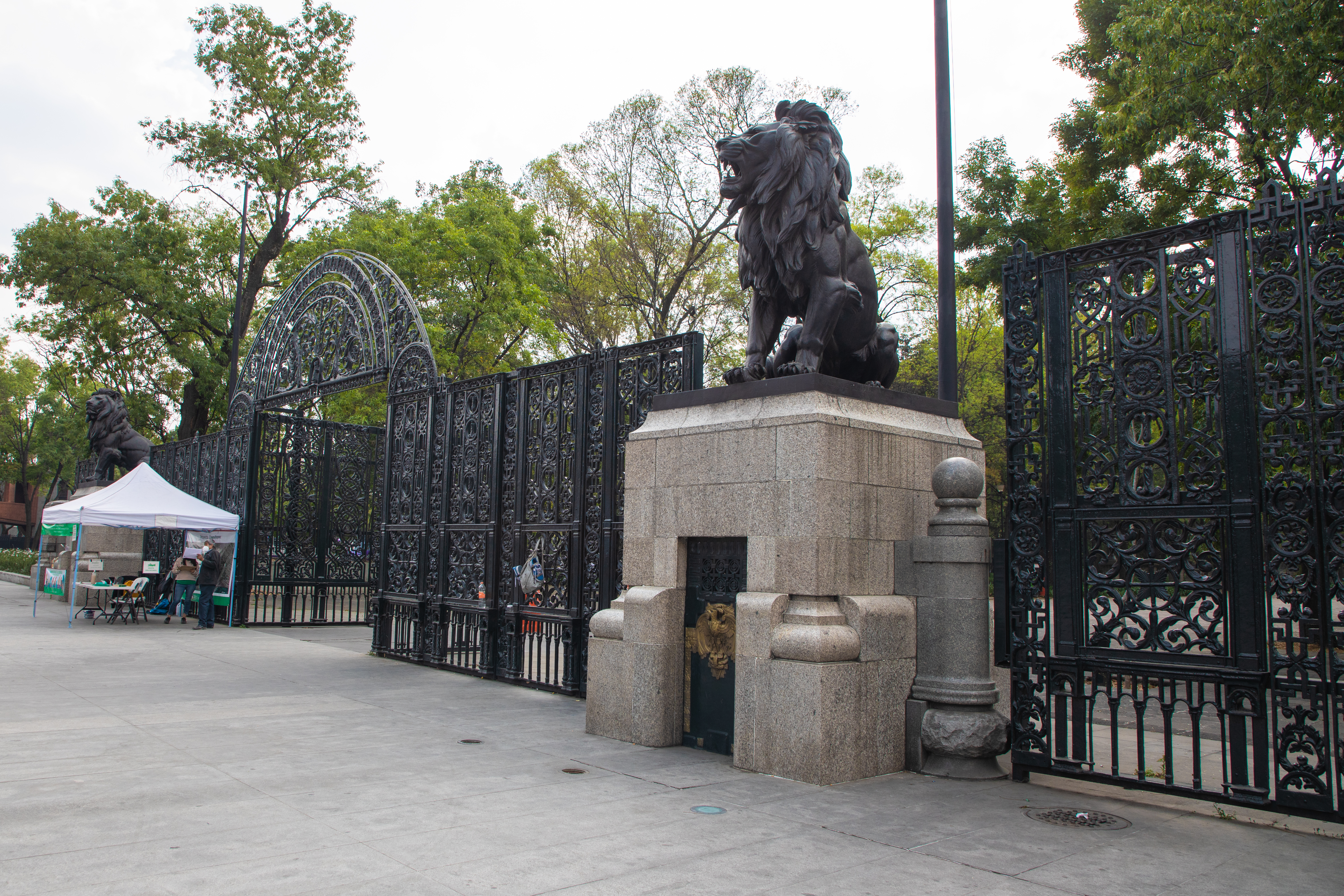
Lateral view of the gate

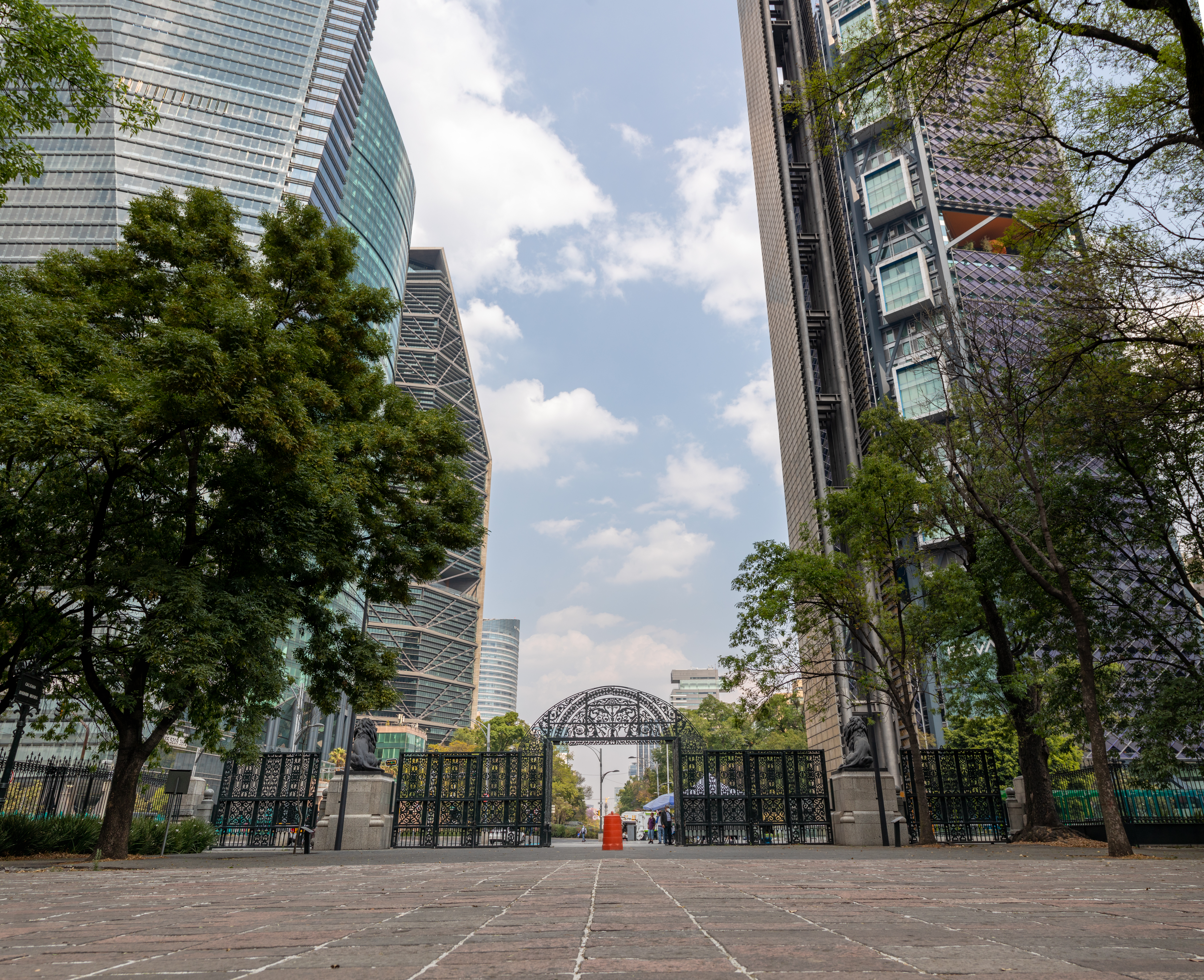
Rear view towards Paseo de la Reforma with the Torre Mayor and the Torre BBVA México in the background.

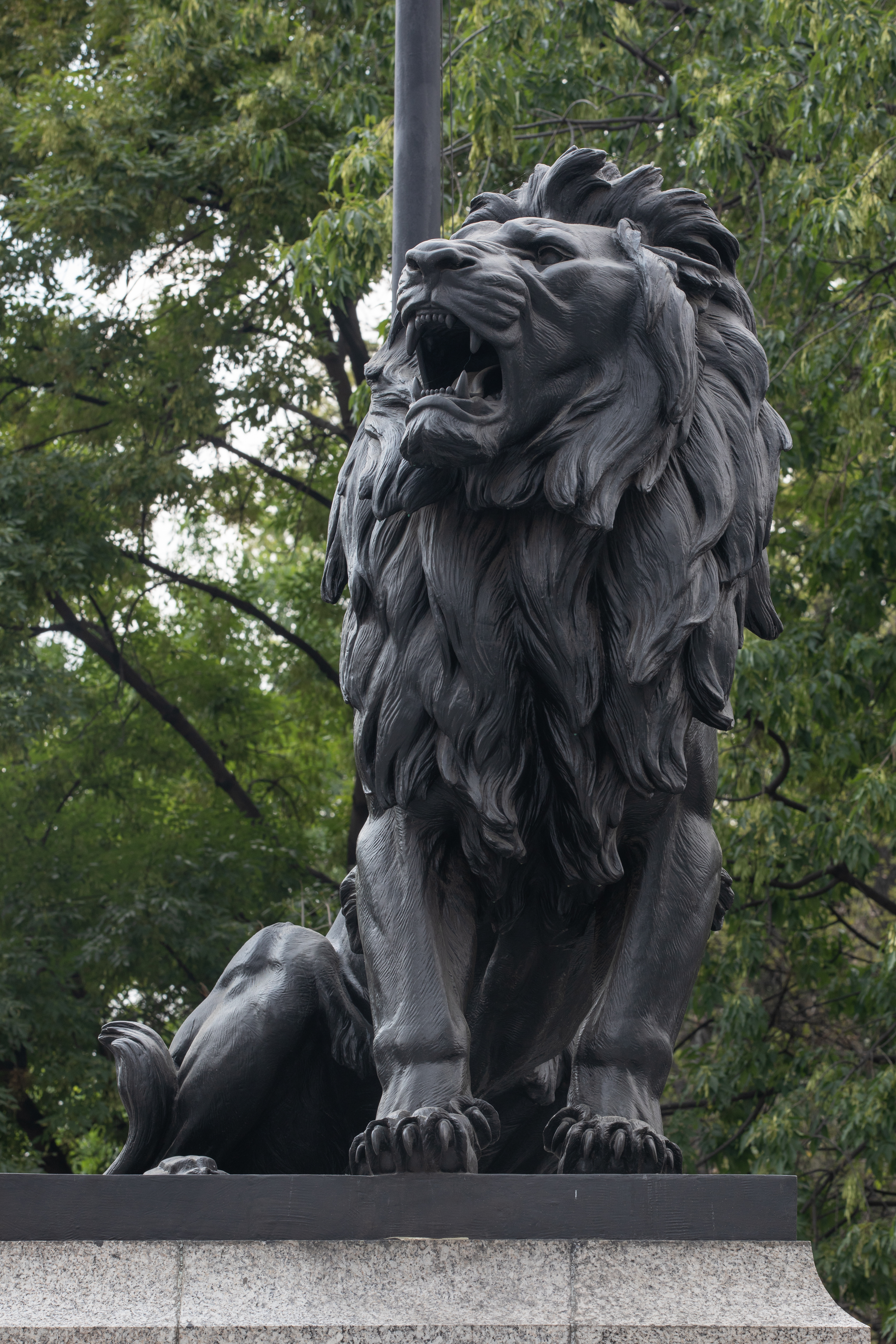
Lion sculpture on the right pedestal.

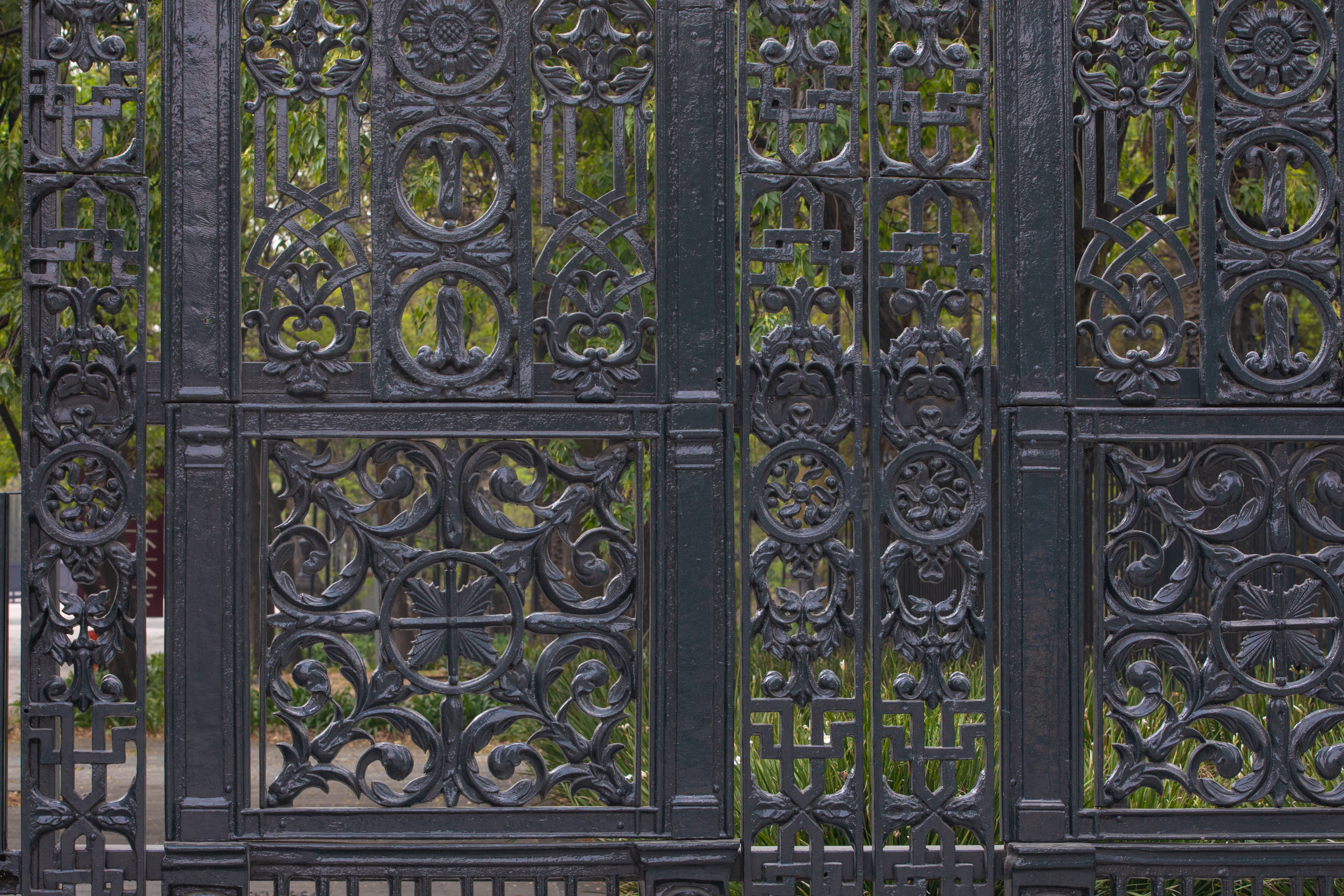
Gate detail.

== History ==
The lion sculptures were created for the Legislative Federal Palace by Émile Bénard in 1898. The palace was never finished due to the spark of the Mexican Revolution and its remnants became the Monument to the Revolution.

The gateway was opened on 17 September 1921.
