= Museo Nacional de Historia =

Coordinates: 19°25′14.16″N 99°10′53.6″W

National Museum of History
- Museo Nacional de Historia
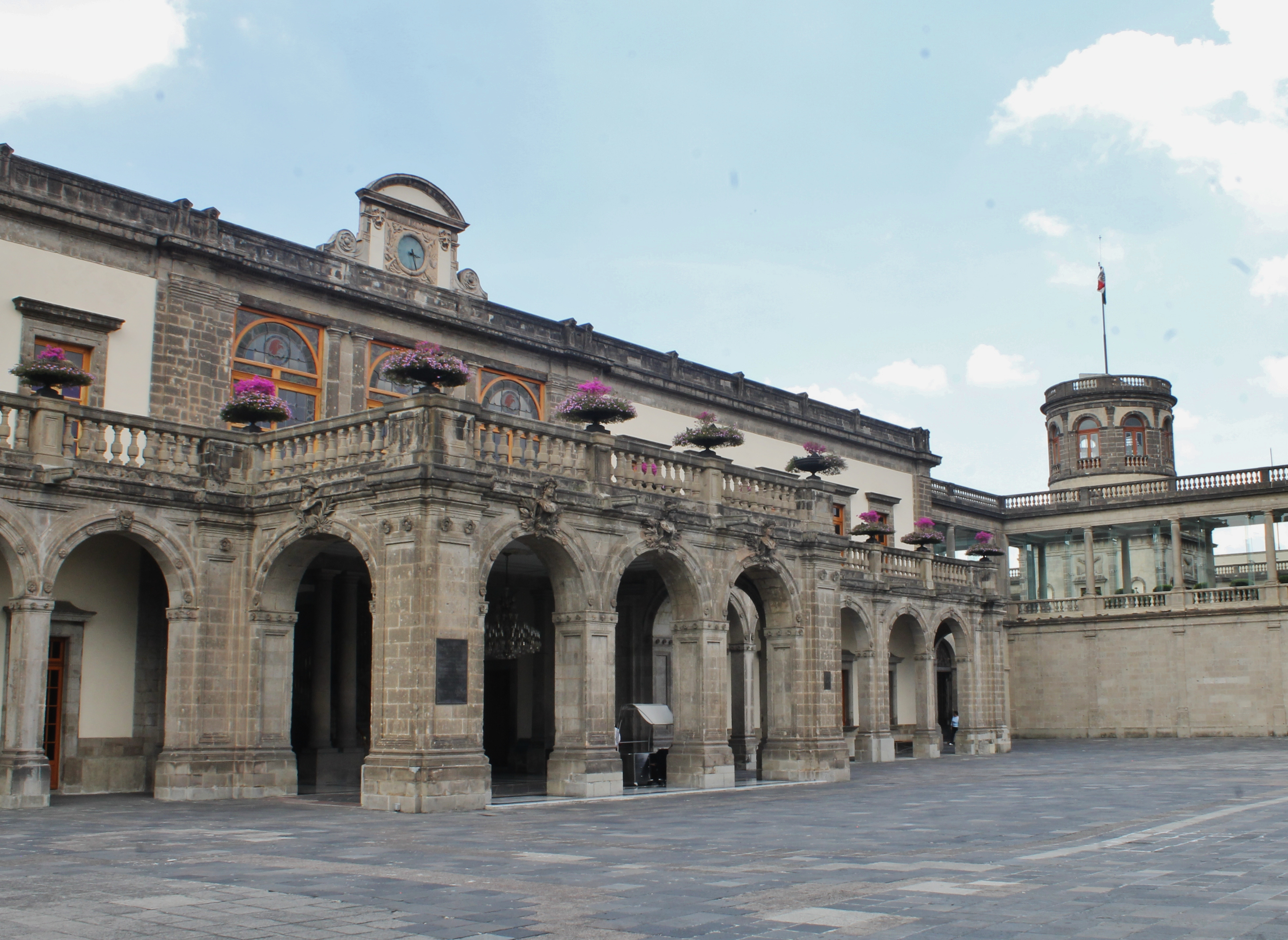
- Entrance to the National Museum of History in the Chapultepec Castle.
- Location in Mexico City
- Location: Mexico City, Mexico
- Type: History museum
- Website: mnh.inah.gob.mx

The National Museum of History (Spanish: Museo Nacional de Historia), also known as MNH, is a national museum of Mexico, located inside Chapultepec Castle in Mexico City. The Castle itself is found within the first section of the well known Chapultepec Park. The museum received 2,135,465 visitors in 2017.

The museum hosts twelve showrooms that house objects from various stages in Mexican history, including the foundation of the Spanish Empire (known in Mexico as "The Conquest"), the New Spain and the Viceregal era (known in Mexico as "The Colonial epoch"), the Mexican War of Independence, the Liberal Reform, and the Revolution of 1910.

On the top floor, in addition to a library, there are two sections with dioramas recreating rooms of the castle during the time when Emperor Maximilian von Habsburg lived there with his wife Princess Carlota.

The museum also hosts a garden area and an old observatory. It is open Tuesday through Sunday from 9:00 am to 5:00 pm.
