= Chapultepec =

Urban park in Mexico City

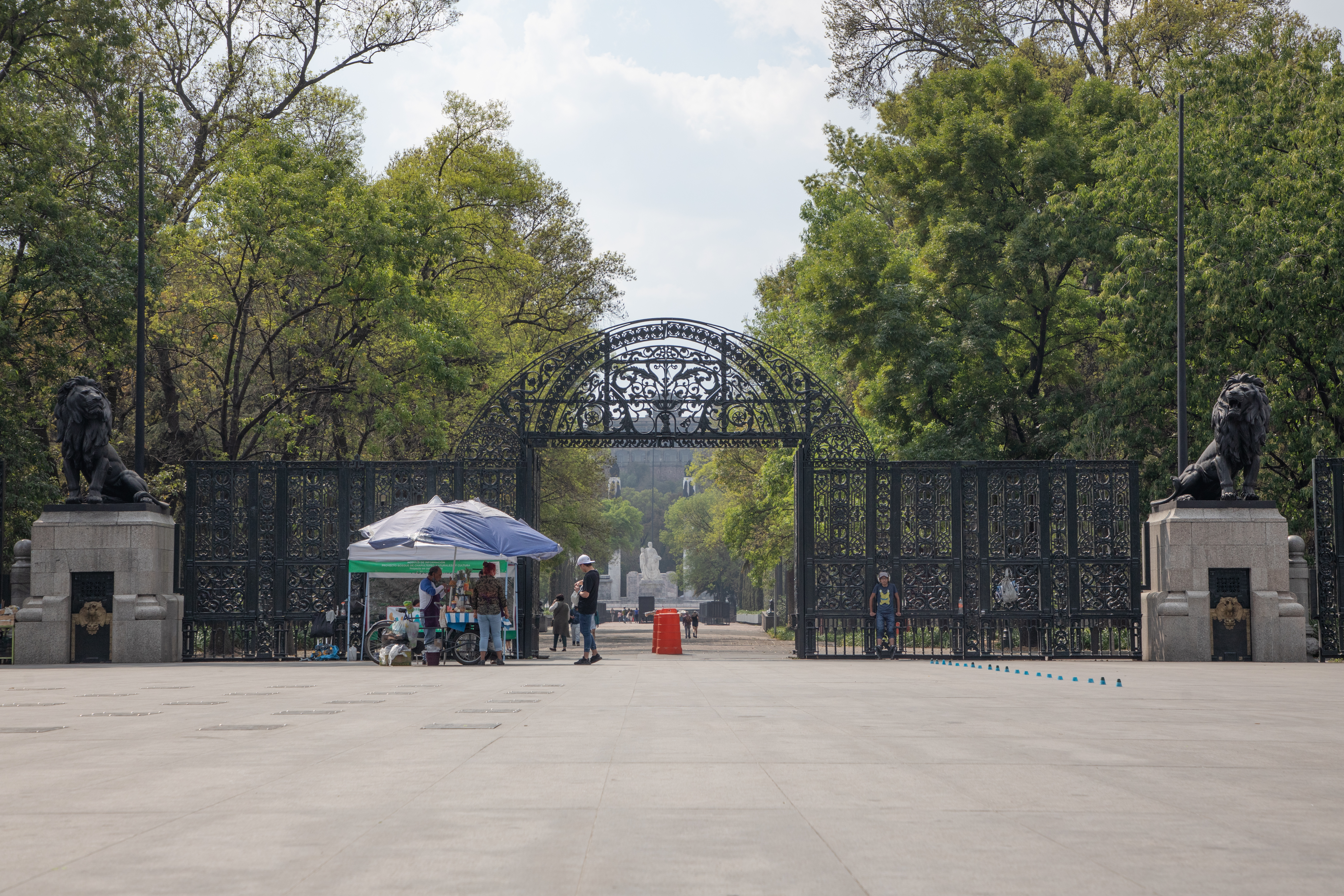
- Puerta de los Leones, the main entrance into Chapultepec
- Interactive map of Chapultepec
- Type: Urban park
- Location: Miguel Hidalgo, Mexico City, Mexico
- Coordinates: 19°24′47″N 99°11′52″W
- Public transit: Chapultepec; Vasco de Quiroga; Chapultepec; Auditorio; Constituyentes; Antropología; Auditorio; Campo Marte; Chapultepec; Gandhi; Cablebús Line 3

Chapultepec, more commonly called the "Bosque de Chapultepec" (Chapultepec Forest) in Mexico City, is one of the largest city parks in Mexico, measuring in total just over 866 hectares (2,140 acres). Centered on a rock formation called Chapultepec Hill, one of the park's main functions is as an ecological space in Greater Mexico City. It is considered the first and most important of Mexico City's "lungs".

The area encompassing modern-day Chapultepec has been inhabited and considered a landmark since the pre-Columbian era, when it became a retreat for Aztec rulers. In the colonial period, Chapultepec Castle was built here, eventually becoming the official residence of Mexico's heads of state. It would remain so until 1934, when Los Pinos, in another area of the forest, became the presidential residence.

Bosque de Chapultepec is divided into four sections, with the first section being the oldest and most visited. This section contains most of the forest attractions, including the castle, the Chapultepec Zoo, the Museum of Anthropology, and the Rufino Tamayo Museum, among others. It receives an estimated 24 million visitors per year. This prompted the need for major rehabilitation efforts that began in 2005 and ended in 2010.

== History ==
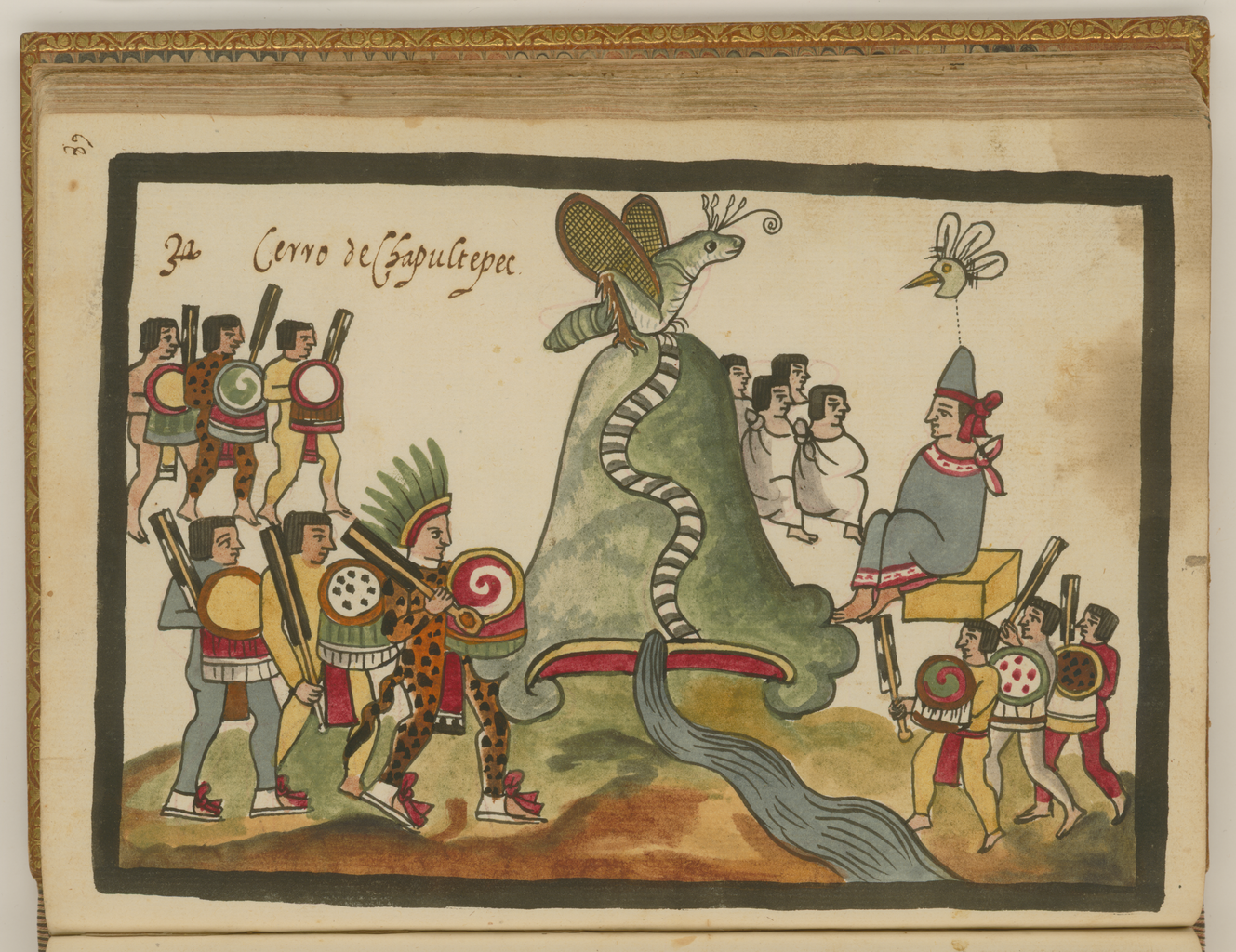
Chapultepec Hill as depicted in the Tovar Codex. The scene shows the Aztec tlatoani Huitzilihuitl and Tepanecs (right) about to be defeated by the warriors of Xochimilco and Chalco (left).

According to studies, there has been human presence in the area since at least the pre-Classic period. The first identified culture archaeologists have evidence for is the Toltecs. The Toltecs named the area "grasshopper hill", which would later become Nahuatl "Chapoltepēc" ("at the grasshopper hill"). Remains of a Toltec altar have been found on the hill's summit. In the Classic Period, the area was occupied by people of the Teotihuacan culture. When the Mexicans, or Aztecs arrived in the Valley of Mexico, it was inhabited by a people called the Tepanecas of Azcapotzalco.

When the Aztecs took over the Valley of Mexico, they considered the hill as both a sacred and strategic site. They began to use the area as a repository for the ashes of their rulers, and the area's springs became an important source of fresh water for the capital of Tenochtitlan. Eventually, the area became a retreat strictly limited to the ruling and religious elite. In the 1420s, ruler Nezahualcoyotl was the first to build a palace in the area. Moctezuma II built reservoirs to raise exotic fish and to store water. He also had trees and plants from various parts of the Aztec Empire planted here. In 1465, Moctezuma I ordered his portrait carved into a rock at the foot of the hill and constructed the Tlaxpana aqueduct, which measured three km.

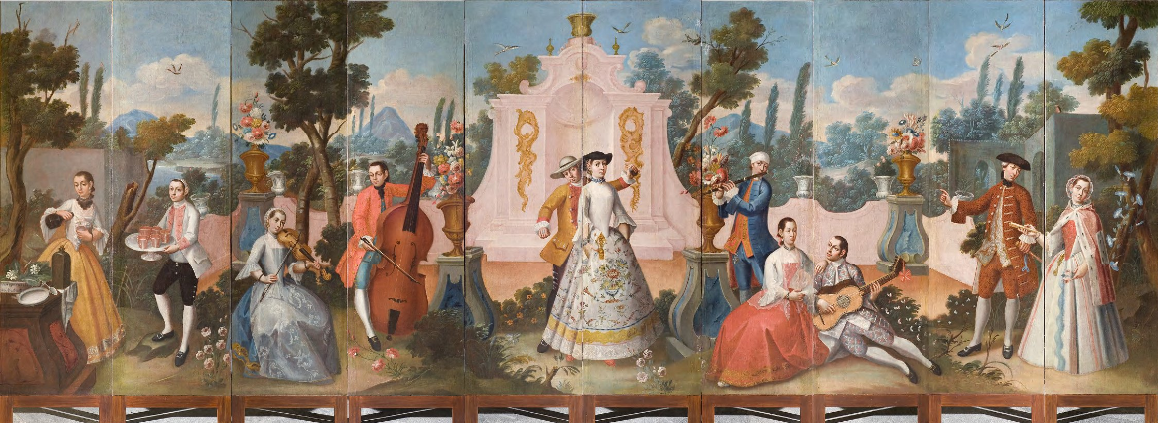
Biombo. Sarao [party] in a garden of Chapultepec, anonymous painter, c. 1780–1790, Mexico City. National Museum of History of Chapultepec Castle.

During the Spanish conquest of the Aztec Empire, one of the last battles between the Spanish and ruler Cuauhtémoc occurred at Chapultepec Hill in 1521. Shortly thereafter, the Franciscans built a small hermitage over the indigenous altar on Chapultepec Hill. Hernán Cortés appropriated Chapultepec and granted the northern portion to Captain Juan Jaramillo, who would become the husband of La Malinche. However, in 1530, Charles V decreed the area as the property of Mexico City and opened it to the public. The Spanish continued to use the Aztec aqueduct, but in 1771, another one was deemed necessary for the growing population of Mexico City. The Chapultepec aqueduct led water from the springs of the forest to an area in what was the south of the city, called Salto del Agua. It flowed over 904 arches and 3,908 meters. In 1785, the Franciscan hermitage was demolished to make way for the Chapultepec Castle, converting the hill and the forest around it into a summer retreat for colonial viceroys. The area was walled off from the general public and was the scene of elegant parties.

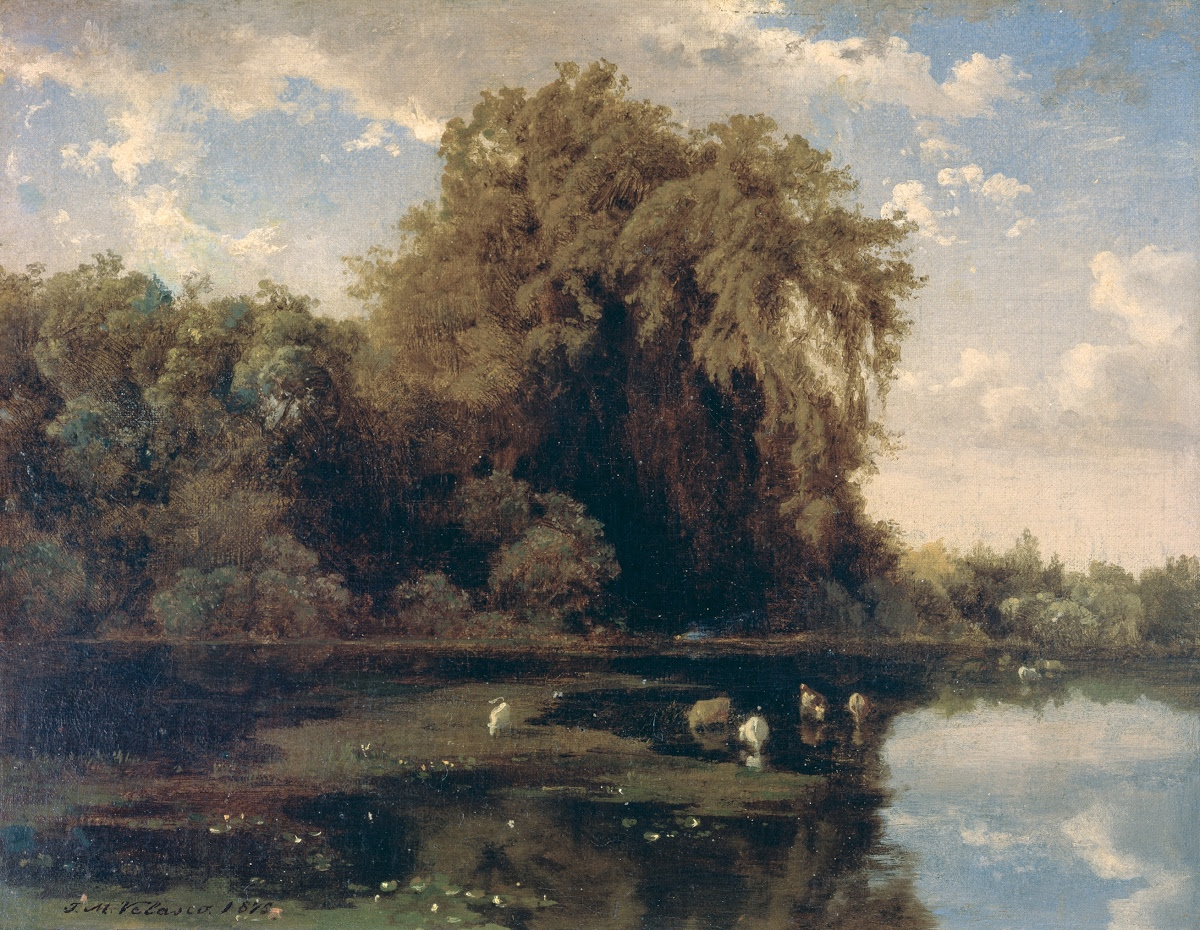
An 1875 painting, Ahuehuetes en Chapultepec, by José María Velasco Gómez depicting the ahuehuetes by the lake in Chapultepec. It is possible this is a view from Chapultepec Castle.

After Mexico achieved independence in 1821, the Castle became the official residence of the head of state. A number of these, especially Emperor Maximilian I and his wife, embellished and expanded the castle as well as the forest area around it.

The Hill was also the site of the Battle of Chapultepec in 1847, between Mexican and U.S. troops led by General Winfield Scott. Once the overwhelming attack was imminent, a band of cadets was ordered to retreat by their superiors, but they chose to stay and defend the castle. Six of them died in the battle, leading them to be known as "los Niños Héroes," and their story is celebrated in Mexico as an example of exemplary patriotism. Many myths have been woven around the story of "los Niños Héroes," the most famous being that of Juan Escutia, who allegedly jumped to his death wrapped in the Mexican flag rather than surrendering to the American troops. Although this is the most commonly known version of the story, many historians believe it wasn't possible. The six cadets are honored by a monument near where the alleged remains of the cadets were found. A hundred years after the war, it is believed that Mexico's president, Miguel Alemán, planted the remains. This was to give more relevance to the patriotic story after a visit from then-president Harry Truman to honor the fallen 100 years after the war wasn't well received.

The castle remained the official residence of Mexican presidents until 1940, when this function was moved to the Los Pinos residence, and the Castle was converted into a museum.

Since then, the park has been expanded twice, adding the second section in 1964 and the third section ten years later. Since then, the focus has been on the maintenance of the area. By 1998, the paths of the park, especially in the first section, were saturated with over 3,000 peddlers with few regulations or norms. In 2005, the first section of the park was closed for renovations, effectively evicting all vendors from the area. When it reopened months later, permits for selling were strictly limited, and police began to crack down on vendors in the park. However, some vendors continue to operate illegally and exchange information on the police's steps with radio communication equipment. At the entrances to the park, where the vendor restrictions are not in place, some vendors sometimes block the entrances and cover signs so that visitors are forced to pass through their stands.

Maintenance issues have closed parts of the park from time to time. In 1985, the park was closed to exterminate rats and other pests. In 2005, the park was filled with trees in poor condition, had scum in the lakes, and had trash piles in several locations, including fountains. From that year until 2010, the park was closed section by section for restoration and rehabilitation projects. The first section was closed for eight months in 2005, for work that included dredging lakes, pruning and removing trees, picking up tons of debris, and expelling hundreds of vendors. Shortly thereafter, projects on the second and third sections of the park began, mostly to control or eliminate rats, feral dogs and cats, pigeons, and other introduced species. In 2005, migratory birds began to make a comeback at the park with the eradication and relocation of introduced species such as geese and ducks, which were aggressive to other species. The park hosts more than 100 species of this kind of bird, with some reproducing here for the first time in decades. Other native mammals returned in 2005, including the Virginia opossum and the cacomistle.

In 2010, projects included renovating jogging tracks, and planting more than 800 trees, including acacia café, pino azul, pino peñonero, holm oak, pino moctezuma, pino prieto and grevilia, as well as the removal of dead or severely infected trees. These rehabilitation efforts of the 2000s were funded by a combination of government and private funds from groups like Probosque.

== Characteristics ==
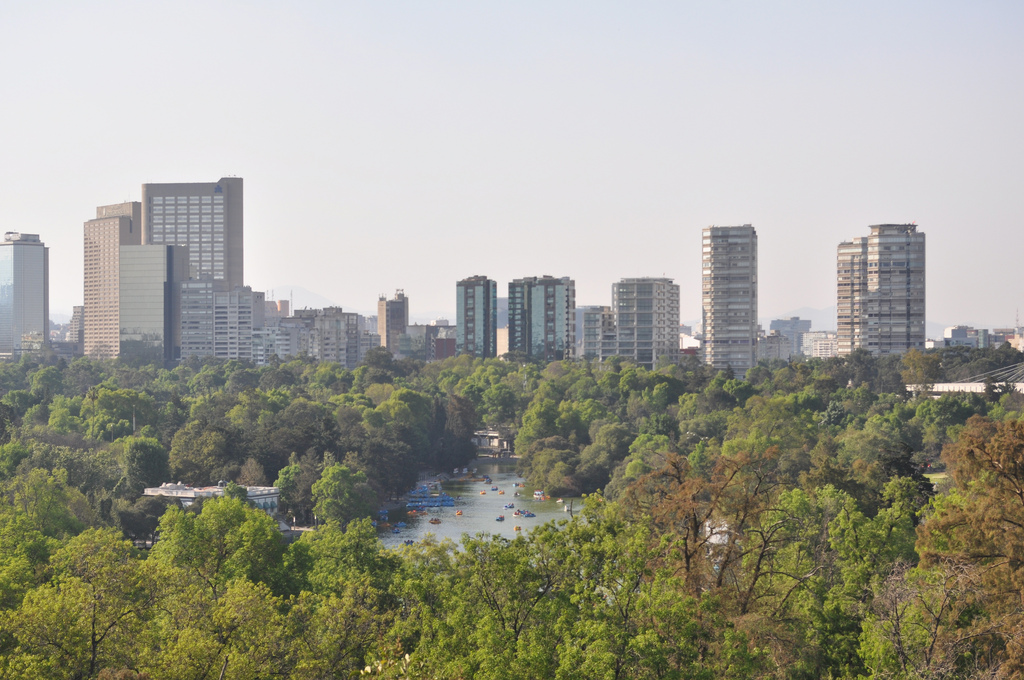
Overlooking the lake towards Polanco from Chapultepec Castle

Chapultepec Park is the second largest city park in Latin America, after the Santiago Metropolitan Park in Chile, measuring in total just over 686 hectares (1,700 acres). It is classed as one of the world's largest and most visited urban parks, along with Bois de Boulogne in Paris, the Imperial Gardens in Tokyo, and Central Park in New York City. The name "Chapultepec" means "at the grasshopper hill" in Nahuatl and refers to a large rock formation that is the center of the park's first section. Originally, this area was a forest outside of Tenochtitlan, once considered sacred in pre-Columbian times, but today it is entirely within the city (mostly in the borough of Miguel Hidalgo), surrounded by some of its primary business and commercial districts. The park is divided into three sections, the first and oldest surrounded by fencing and closed at night, with the other two left open. It contains nine museums, amusement parks, winding paths, commemorative sculptures, lakes and fountains. Paseo de la Reforma passes most of the park and cuts through a portion on the north side.

One of the park's main functions is to be an ecological space for Greater Mexico City. It is considered the first and most important of Mexico City's "lungs", with trees that replenished oxygen to the Valley of Mexico. It is a large unpaved area that allows for aquifer recharge, ameliorates the "heat-island" effect, and attracts rain. It is a refuge for migratory birds from Canada, the U.S. and other regions of Mexico, including the Cooper hawk, the Harris's hawk, wild ducks, and Vireos, Warblers and Kingfishers. Anywhere from 20 to 60 species of birds can be found here during one morning birding, including some native non-migratory species such as the Berylline Hummingbird, Lesser Goldfinch, House Finch, Rufous-backed Robin, Black-backed Oriole, Cinnamon-bellied Flowerpiercer and breeding colonies of Great Egret and Black-crowned Night Heron There are also more than a dozen species of reptiles and amphibians, and a number of species of various types that are in danger of extinction, including the axolotl, Goodeidae, and alandria moths. The park is home to a large number of Montezuma cypress, locally called "ahuehuete" trees, with some hundreds of years old. Many of them were planted by the Aztecs. There are also 165 other species, mostly in the third section. It is estimated by city authorities that MXN$100 million are needed annually to maintain the ecology of the park.

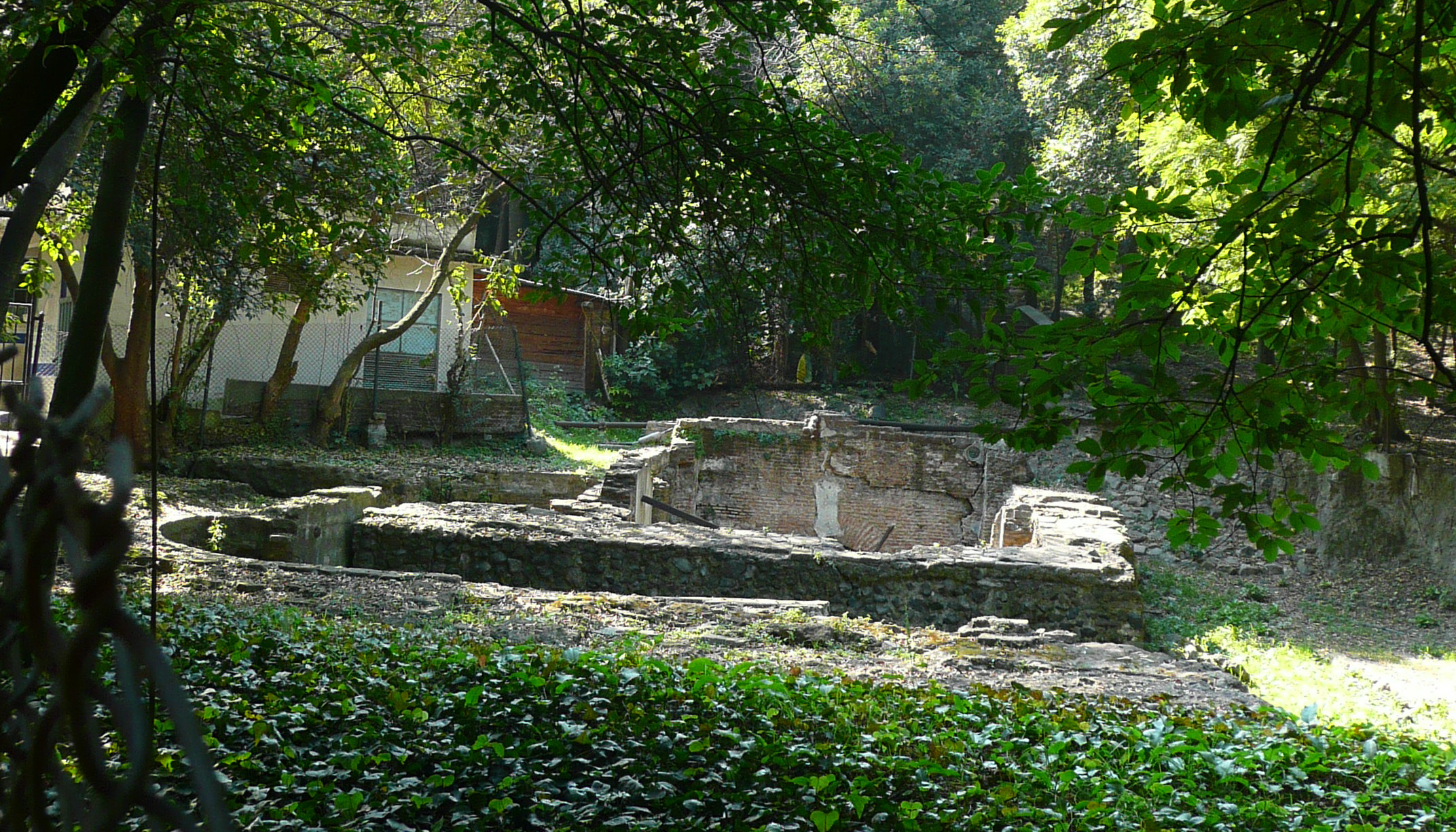
One of the Baths of Chapultepec

For Mexico City residents, the park is valued as a cultural and historic area as well as green space. The area has vestiges showing human presence as far back as the Toltecs with a number ruins from the pre-Columbian through to the colonial period. Archeological studies have unearthed and identified tombs associated with Teotihuacan, a Toltec altar on the summit of Chapultepec Hill, remains of a colonial era aqueduct, paths associated with Nezahualcoyotl, and an area where Aztec priests ingested peyote as part of religious rites. One notable site is the Baths of Moctezuma, which was a systems of tanks, reservoirs, canals and waterfalls constructed by the Aztecs. The Instituto Nacional de Antropología e Historia has the park, as well as the Castle of Chapultepec on the hill, listed as Mexican heritage sites. They submitted the area for consideration as a World Heritage Site in 2001.

The park received an estimated 15 million visitors each year, and daily visits exceed 250,000. Sunday is the most popular day to visit because the museums are free, and visitors may spend the entire day in one or more sections viewing the attractions, picnicking, or grilling. Despite its local popularity, however, foreign visitors usually only see the small fraction of the park near the museums. The park is easy to get to via public transportation. Chapultepec metro station provides easy access to the park from Mexico City Metro Metro Line 1 and Mexico City Metrobús Line 7, while Constituyentes metro station and Auditorio metro station provide access from Mexico City Metro Line 7. There is also access have stations at park entrances to the east and south respectively. Several bus lines along Paseo de la Reforma.

General scheme of the three sections Chapultepec, Panteón Civil de Dolores, and Tacubaya, Polanco in Miguel Hidalgo delegation, in Spanish. The fourth section is not included on the map and is located roughly where the key to the map is printed.

== First section ==
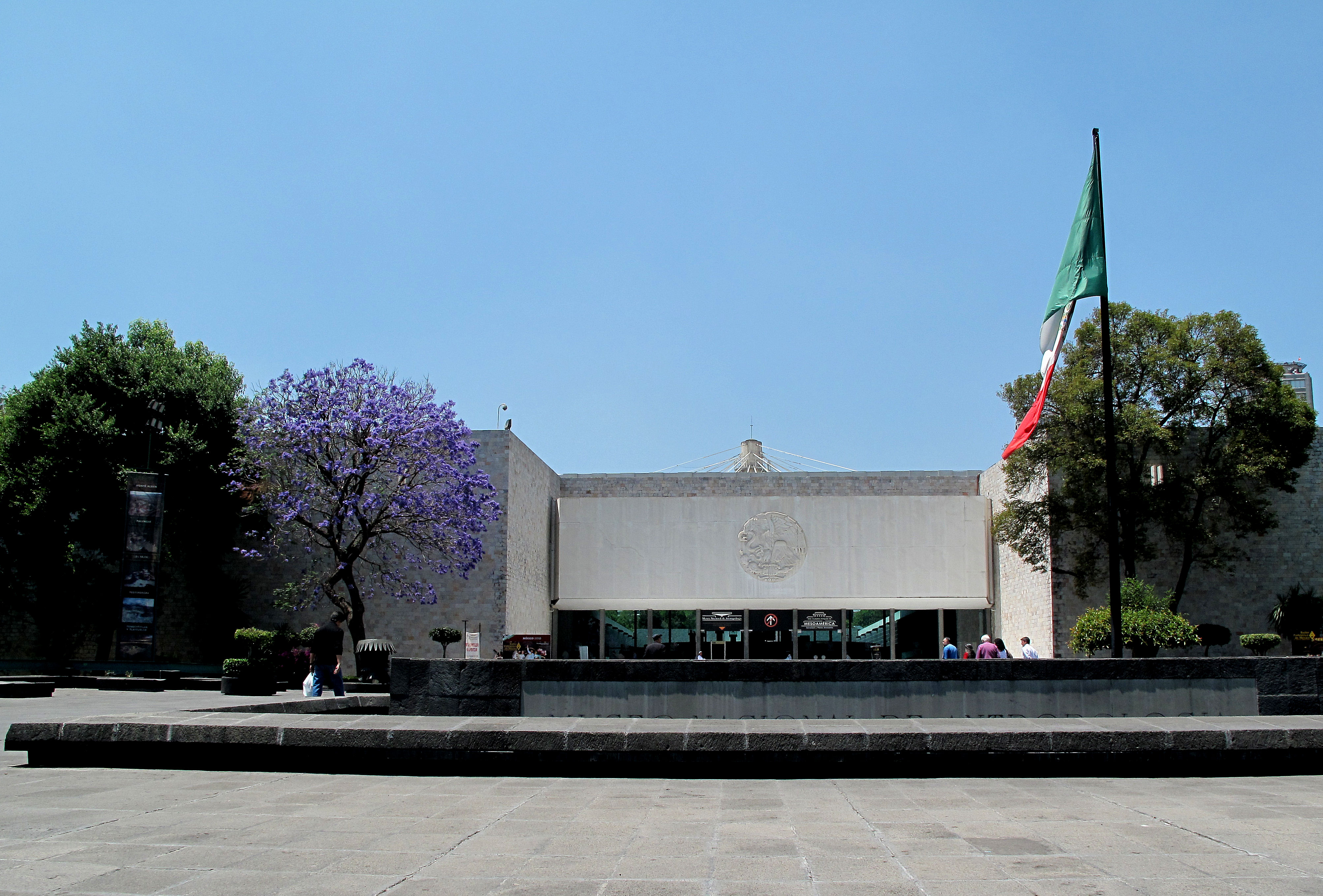
National Museum of Anthropology

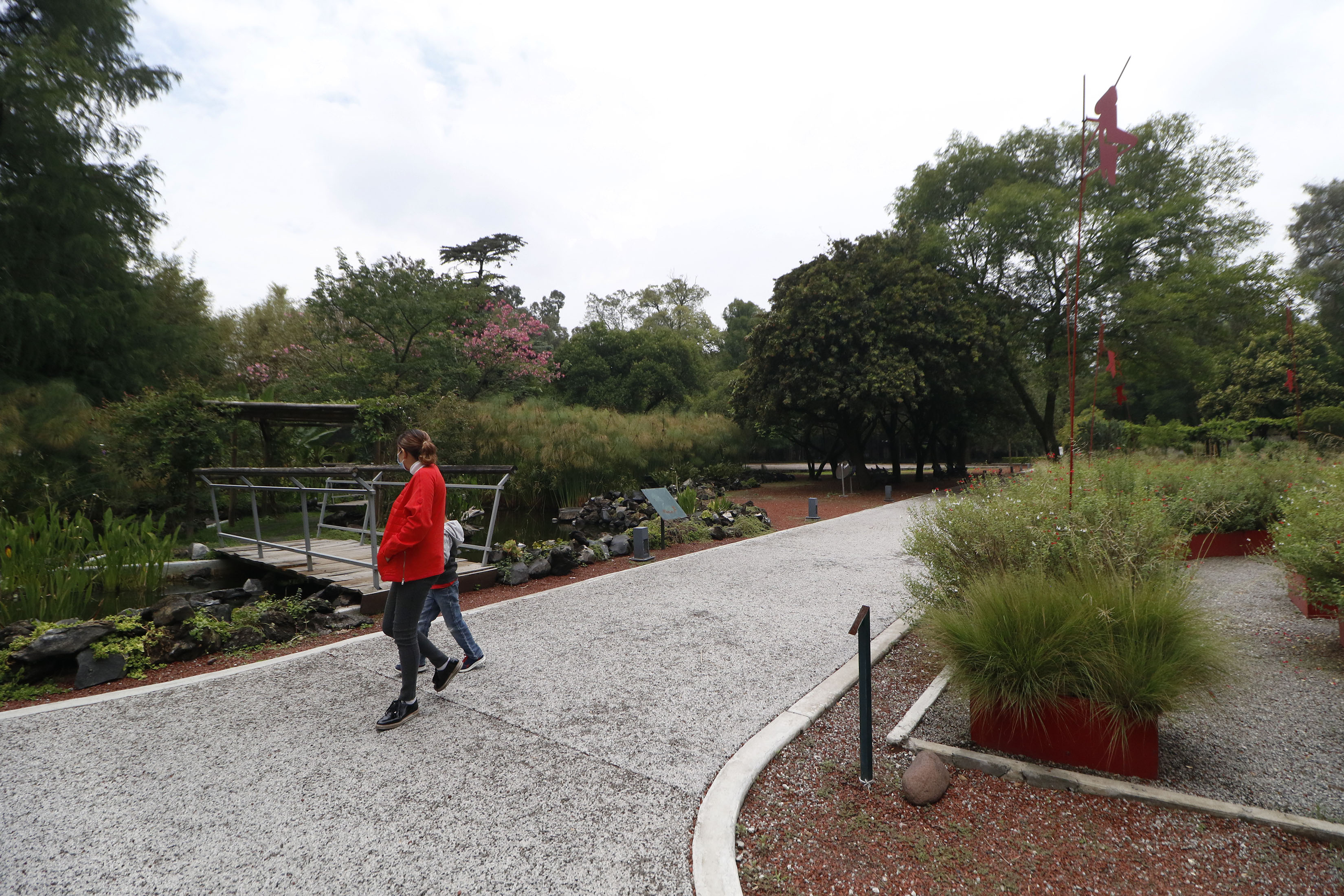
Path through the botanical garden in the first section

The oldest and most visited portion of the park is called the "first section". It is the most developed area, and it has a wrought iron fence and gates that extend around its perimeter. These fences mostly separate it from the streets that form its boundaries: Avenida Constituyentes, Paseo de la Reforma (at Puerta de los Leones), Calzada Chivatito, and the Anillo Periférico. The interior measures 274.03 hectares (677.1 acres), with 182 hectares (450 acres) of this being undeveloped green space. It contains most of the best known of the park's attractions, such as the Lago Menor (Small Lake), the Nezahuacoyotl Fountain, the Fuente de las Ranas, the Quixote Fountain, the Templanza Fountain, the Altar a la Patria, the Obelisco a los Niños Héroes, the Monumento a las Águilas Caídas (Monument to Fallen Eagles), The Ahuehuete, and the Baths of Moctezuma. The best-known museums in the park are in this section, including Museo Nacional de Historia-Chapultepec Castle, the Casa del Lago, the National Auditorium, the Centro Cultural del Bosque, the National Museum of Anthropology, the Rufino Tamayo Museum, and the Museo de Arte Moderno (Modern Art Museum). It also contains the Chapultepec Zoo, the Jardín de la Tercera Edad, and the Audiorama. These are connected by various paved paths, many of which have names such as the Avenue of the Poets, which is lined with bronze busts of famous literary figures. The pathway also has trees that are hundreds of years old.

This section of the park also contains the geological formation that gave the park/forest its name: Chapultepec Hill. It is a formation of volcanic rock and andesite, which is common in the Valley of Mexico and contains small caves and sand deposits. "Chapultepec" in Nahuatl means "grasshopper hill" but it is not clear whether the "Chapul" (grasshopper) part refers to the shape of the hill, or the abundance of grasshoppers in the surrounding woods. This hill was considered special during the pre-Hispanic period from the Toltecs in the 12th century to the Aztecs up to the time of the Conquest by the Spanish. Remains of a Toltec altar have been found at the top of the hill, a number of burials and its use was reserved only for Aztec emperors and other elite.

After the Conquest, a small chapel dedicated to the Archangel Michael was built on the hill by Claudio de Arciniega in the middle of the 16th century. In the 18th century, the Spanish built the Chapultepec Castle, which initially was a summer retreat for viceroys. After the Independence, the Castle remained for the elite, becoming the official residence of Mexico's heads of state, including the Emperor Maximilian, who had the Paseo de la Reforma built to connect this area with the historic center of the city. During this time, the Castle and the gardens around it were enlarged and embellished a number of times, giving the Castle a floorspace of 10,000 m^{2} (110,000 ft^{2}). The most outstanding of the patios and garden is the Alcázar. In 1940, the president's residence was moved to the nearby Los Pinos complex, and the castle was converted into the National Museum of History, under the auspices of the federal government, along with the rest of the hill. The museum contains twelve rooms which are open to the public, many of which as they were when the Emperor Maximilian lived there. It also contains a collection of furniture from the colonial period to the 19th century, utensils, suits, coins, manuscripts, sculptures in clay ivory and silver, and many other art works. A number of items belonged to figures such as Miguel Hidalgo y Costilla, José María Morelos y Pavón, Agustín de Iturbide, Benito Juárez, Emiliano Zapata, and others. In addition, there are murals by José Clemente Orozco, David Alfaro Siqueiros and Juan O'Gorman. At the foot of the hill, there is a large monument to the Niños Héroes (also called the Altar a la Patria), who reportedly threw themselves to their death at the Castle rather than surrendering to invading US troops in 1847. This monument consist of six marble columns surrounding a mausoleum with the remains of the six cadets, and a figure of a woman who represents Mexico.

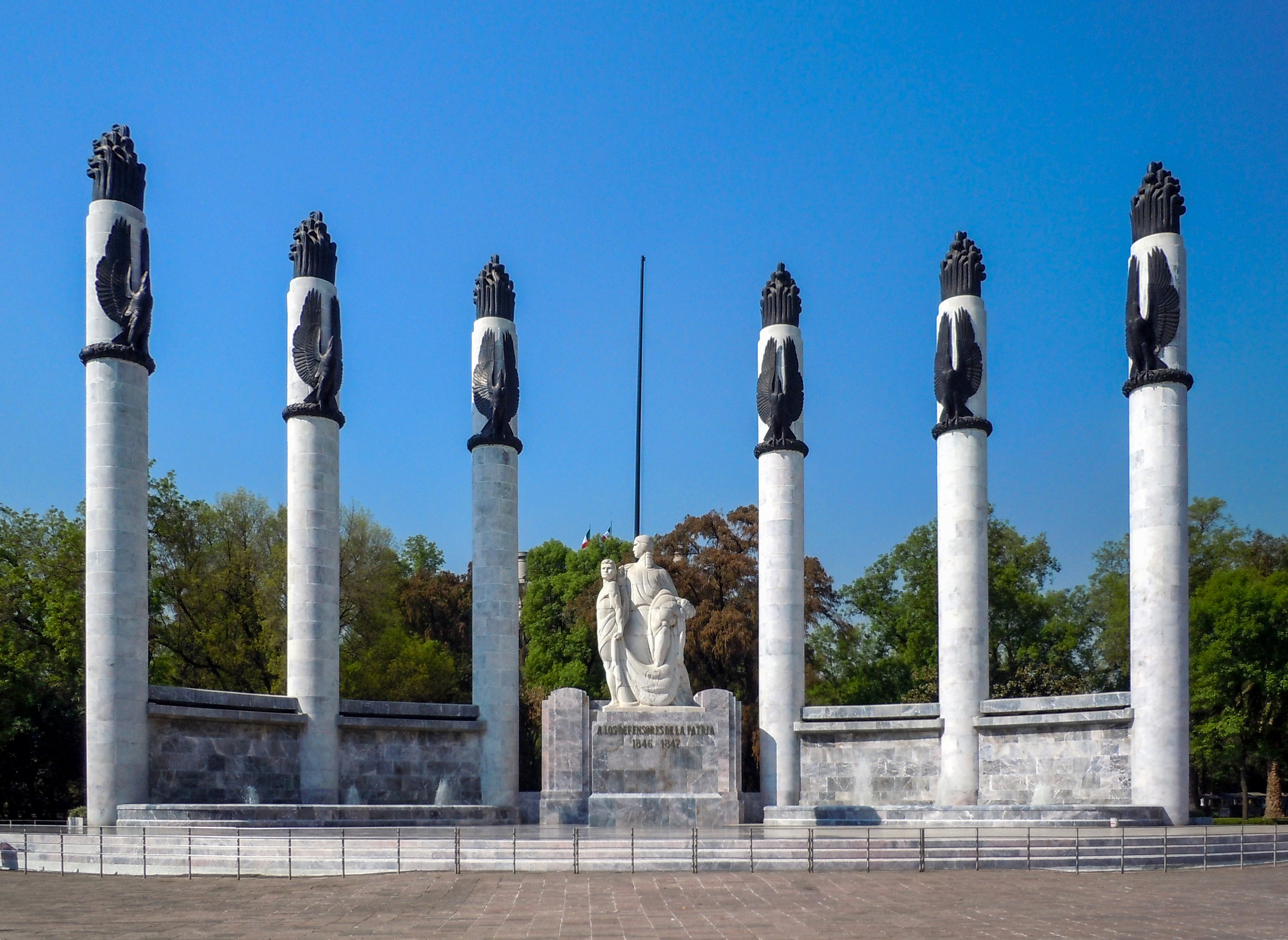
Monumento a los Niños Héroes

The Chapultepec Zoo is the most visited attraction of the park, especially on Sundays. It is estimated that half of all park visitors come to the zoo. The zoo was established by Alfonso L. Herrera, a biologist, and opened in 1924. Herrera's intention was to reestablish the zoo tradition of the old Aztec emperors and improve upon it. He began with species native to Mexico and then added others from the rest of the world. He modeled the zoo after the Bioparco di Roma in Rome, Italy. Between 1950 and 1960, the zoo expanded and added new species. In 1975, the zoo obtained two pandas from China. Since then, at least eight panda cubs have been born at the zoo, making it the first institution outside of China to breed the species. From 1992 to 1994, the zoo was completely remodeled, categorizing exhibits by habitat rather than type of species. Some of the most important Mexican species at the facility include a rabbit native to only a few volcanoes in Mexico, the volcano rabbit, the Mexican wolf, ocelot, jaguar and axolotl. Today, it has 16,000 animals of 270 species, separated into four sections according to habitat: tropical forest, temperate forest, desert, and grassland. About one third of the animals are native to Mexico.

Most of the museums in the first section are located along Paseo de la Reforma. Of all of the museums in the park, the most famous is the National Museum of Anthropology, considered one of the most famous archeological museums in the world. The museum has a number of antecedents beginning from the colonial period, but the current institution was created in the 1960s with the building and grounds designed by architect Pedro Ramírez Vázquez. This museum has an area of 44,000 m^{2} (470,000 ft^{2}) and 25 exhibit halls with sections devoted to each of the major pre-Hispanic civilizations in Mexico, including the Aztec, Maya, Toltec, and Olmec. The permanent collection is quite large, and many visitors spend several hours seeing it. There are also temporary exhibits displayed year-round. The Rufino Tamayo Museum is in the first section on Paseo de la Reforma. The permanent collection mostly focuses on the namesake, but there are also works by other Mexican and foreign artists that Tamayo donated. During his lifetime, Tamayo collected one of the most important collections of 20th-century art, which included art works from Andy Warhol, Picasso, Miró, Fernando Botero, Magritte, and about 100 others.

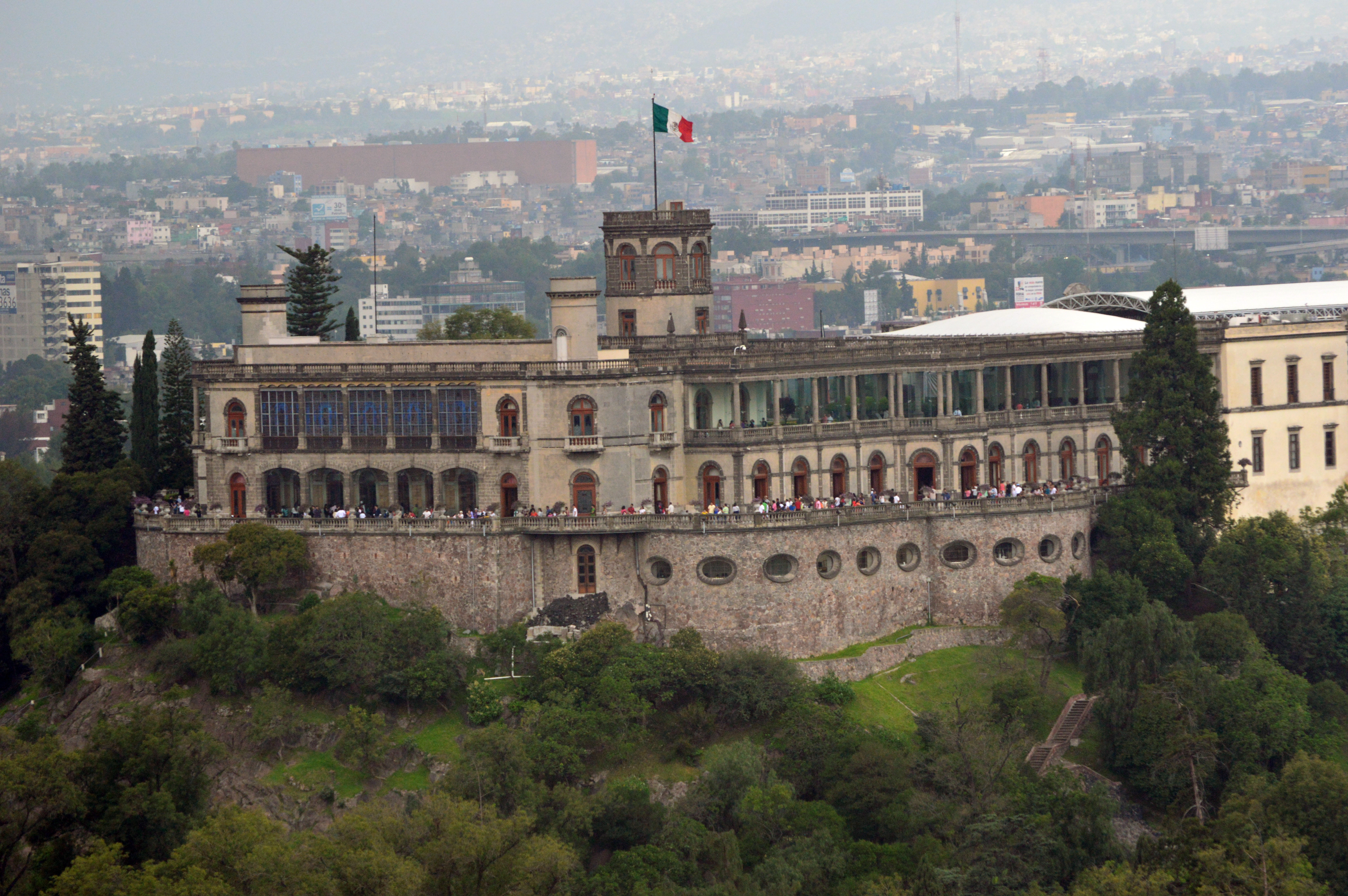
Chapultepec Castle on top of Chapultepec Hill

The Museo de Arte Moderno (Museum of Modern Art) is located on Paseo de la Reforma and Calle Gandhi, and it hosts various temporary exhibits. The museum's complex was constructed using modern architecture techniques, which consisted of two circular buildings surrounding a sculpture garden. It contains one of the leading collections of modern art of the 20th century of Mexico. Artists include Dr. Atl, Frida Kahlo, David Alfaro Siqueiros, and Remedios Varo.

The Casa de Cultura Quinta Colorada was originally a former accommodation for the forest rangers of the area in the early 20th century. The house was made using European style architecture techniques. It hosts various cultural activities for visitors and has a small planetarium.

At the foot of the Chapultepec Hill is an extension of the Museum of History called the Museo del Caracol (Snail Museum). This museum narrates the history of Mexico in the winding form of a snail, the shape of the building from which its name comes.

The Luis Barragán House and Studio is the former home of architect Luis Barragán. The house was kept nearly intact since 1948, including the workshop. It also exhibits artworks from the 19th and 20th century.

One of the most popular features in the first section is an artificial lake called the Lago Menor (Smaller Lake). It is one of two lakes in the park; the larger one, Lago Mayor, is in the second section. Lago Menor, however, attracts more visitors than the other. Visitors can rent paddleboats and small rowboats at the lake. The Lago Menor was created in the late 19th century, when the first section (then the entire park) was redesigned. At the same time Lago Menor was created, the Casa del Lago was constructed. It is shallow with an average depth of a little over one meter. The Casa del Lago, also called the Restaurante del Lago, is now a restaurant that serves continental food and some Mexican dishes.

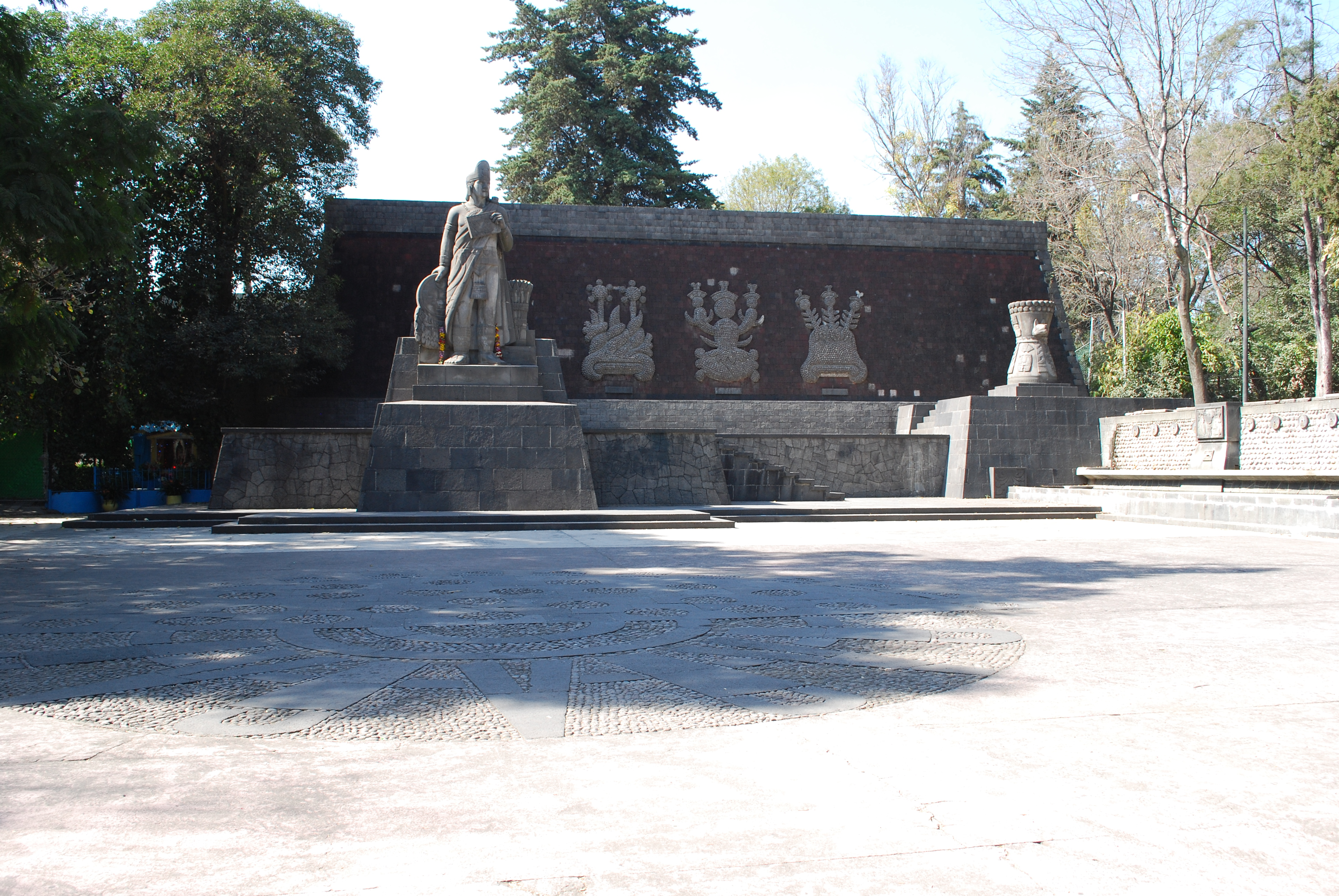
Nezahualcoyotl Fountain in Chapultepec Park

In addition to the lake, there are a number of large fountains. The Quixote Fountain is surrounded by four benches covered in tile with images of Don Quixote. To the side of this plaza, there are two columns. On the right there is a figure of Quixote with the face of Salvador Dalí and on the other side, there is a depiction of Sancho Panza with the face of Diego Rivera. Both statues were made of bronze by José María Fernández Urbina. The Fuente de las Ranas (Fountain of the Frogs) was created in the 1920s, by Miguel Alessio Robles in Seville, Spain. The Nezahualcoyotl Fountain was inaugurated in 1956. It measures 1,250 m^{2} (13,500 ft^{2}) and surrounds a statue of the Aztec ruler nine meters tall in black stone.

Throughout the first section, there are different kinds of trees; the most common one is the Montezuma cypress, locally called "ahuehuetes". A number of these are hundreds of years old, although there are far fewer due to a past disease epidemic. One dead specimen is called the Ahuehuete of Moctezuma, commonly referred to as El Sargento (The Sargeant) or as the Centinela (Sentinel). The last two names were given by cadets of the Heroic Military Academy during the 19th century. The 500-year-old tree remains as a monument to the area's history, measuring 50 metres (160 ft) high, forty in circumference. Another tree of the species, still living, is El Tlatoani, which is more than 700 years old and is the oldest tree in the park. In addition to these trees, there are sequoias, cedars, palms, poplars, pines, ginkgos, and more.

Los Pinos has been the official residence of the presidents of Mexico since 1941. Though the presidential residence is inside the park, there is no public access to it. The residence is made up of white stucco structures; this architecture can be seen from Molino del Rey, a former millhouse and site of a battle of the Mexican–American War in 1847. Los Pinos is on one edge of the park.

The National Auditorium is one of Mexico City's principal arenas. It primarily hosts musical ensembles and dance troupes. Singers from Mexico and abroad perform there yearlong. The park hosts a number of cultural events during the year. One of them is the performance of Swan Lake, which is conducted on a stage in Lago Menor. This performance has been given since 1978 in warmer months. Night tours by train that go around the park are popular around Christmas time, when many of the attractions are lit for the season. The Ballet Folklórico de México also holds performances on occasion at Chapultepec Castle.

== Second section ==
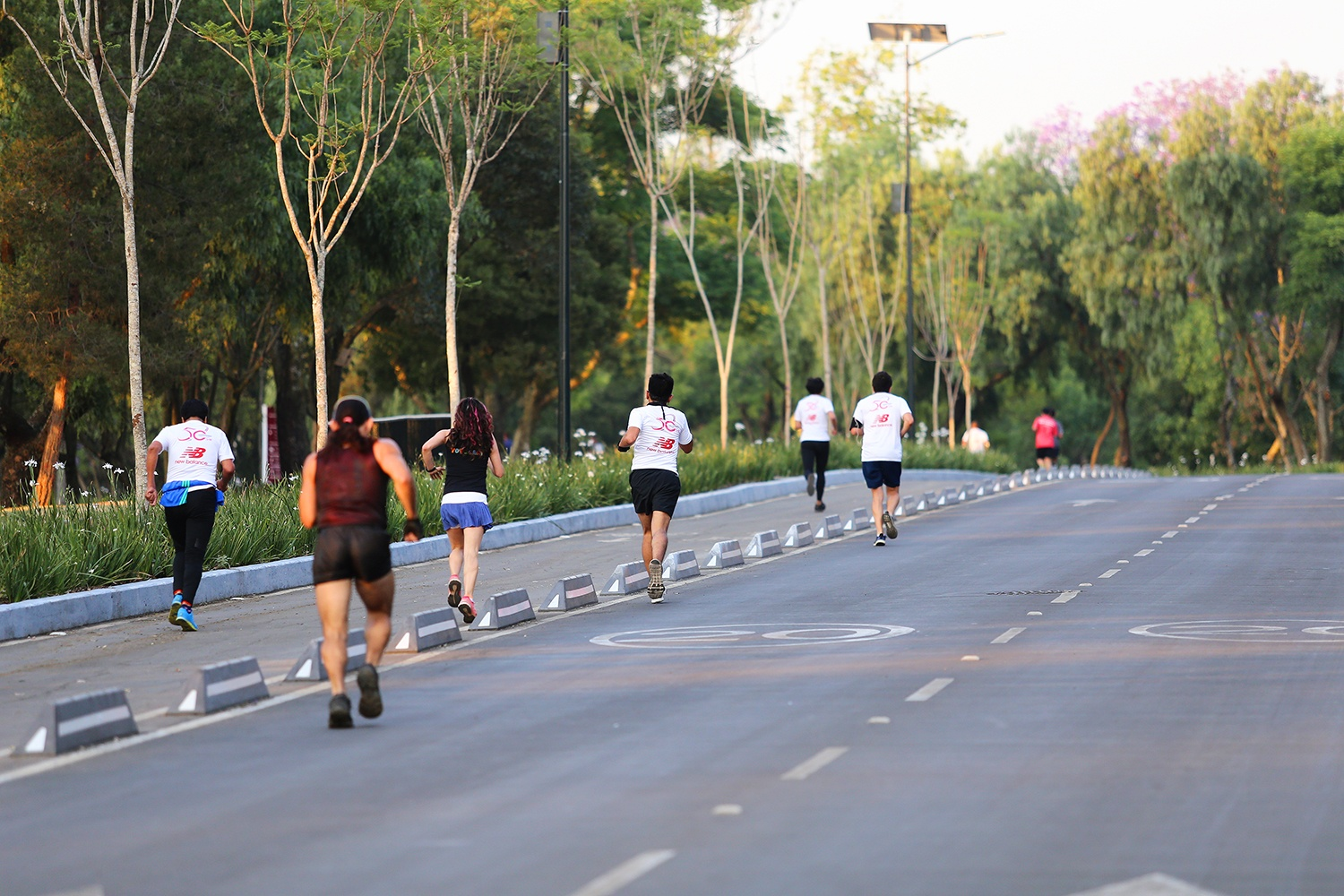
People running at "El Sope" public track, second section of Chapultepec

The second section of the park was created in 1964 by expanding over former farmlands. This section is separated by Anillo Periférico road and measures 160.02 hectares. It is not as developed as the first section, but it is also dedicated to recreational activities. Lago Mayor overlaps with the second section; this part of the lake contains the Monumental Fountain, the largest one in Latin America. It is surrounded by several restaurants and cafés. Nearby are the Compositores, Xochipilli and Las Serpientes fountains.

The area contains jogging trails, places for yoga and karate, and other exercise facilities on the tree areas. Around 1,000 people each day go to this section to exercise. The jogging trails were doubled from 2 km to 4 km in the late 2000s.

One part of this section was dominated by the Feria de Chapultepec amusement park, located near the Lago Mayor, just off the Anillo Periférico. The park had a capacity of 15,000 people and was visited by about two million each year. It includes several roller coasters, including the Quimera. The park closed in 2019 after a fatal incident on Quimera. The park will be replaced by Atzlan Parque Urbana, a more verdant park with a larger focus on live entertainment and themed to Mexico City's neighborhood. It will feature a few rides and is expected to open in the next few years.

This section contains museums such as Papalote Museo del Niño and the Museo de Historia Natural. El Papalote Museo del Niño is an interactive children's museum which invites children to touch and manipulate the exhibits.

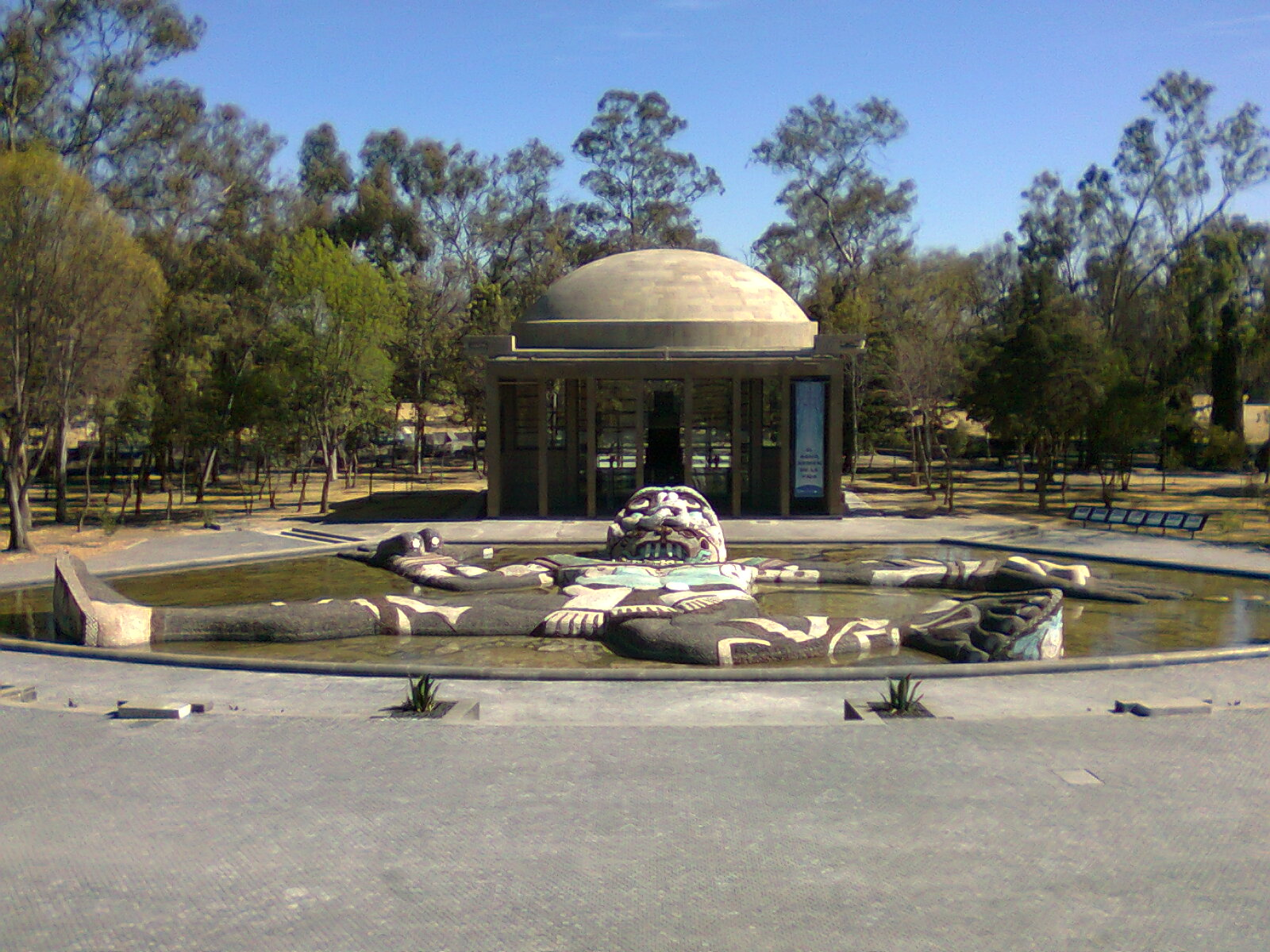
The Cárcamo and Tlaloc's fountain

The Cárcamo de Dolores hydraulic structure, found in this section, was built between 1942 and 1952 to capture water sent to the Valley of Mexico from the Lerma River basin in the Toluca Valley. The major parts open to the public consist of a pavilion, covered with an orange half cupola and a fountain with an image of Tlaloc. Originally, the water was stored underground and pumped to the surface when needed. The main building has serpent heads on the four corners and there is a mural painted by Diego Rivera called El agua: origen de la vida.

In 2010, the second section of the park underwent rehabilitation, funded in part by a private charity group called Probosque de Chapultepec. Most of the work was done on the jogging track, the Tlaloc Fountain, the Cárcamo de Dolores building, the El agua: origen de la vida mural, and the construction of an agora. These works together form the Museo Jardín del Agua (Water Garden Museum). In addition, a large number of dead trees were removed and about 800 new ones planted. There is also a carousel located in this area, having been relocated from the now defunct Charlestowne Mall in St. Charles, IL, after the mall closed down in 2017.

== Third section ==
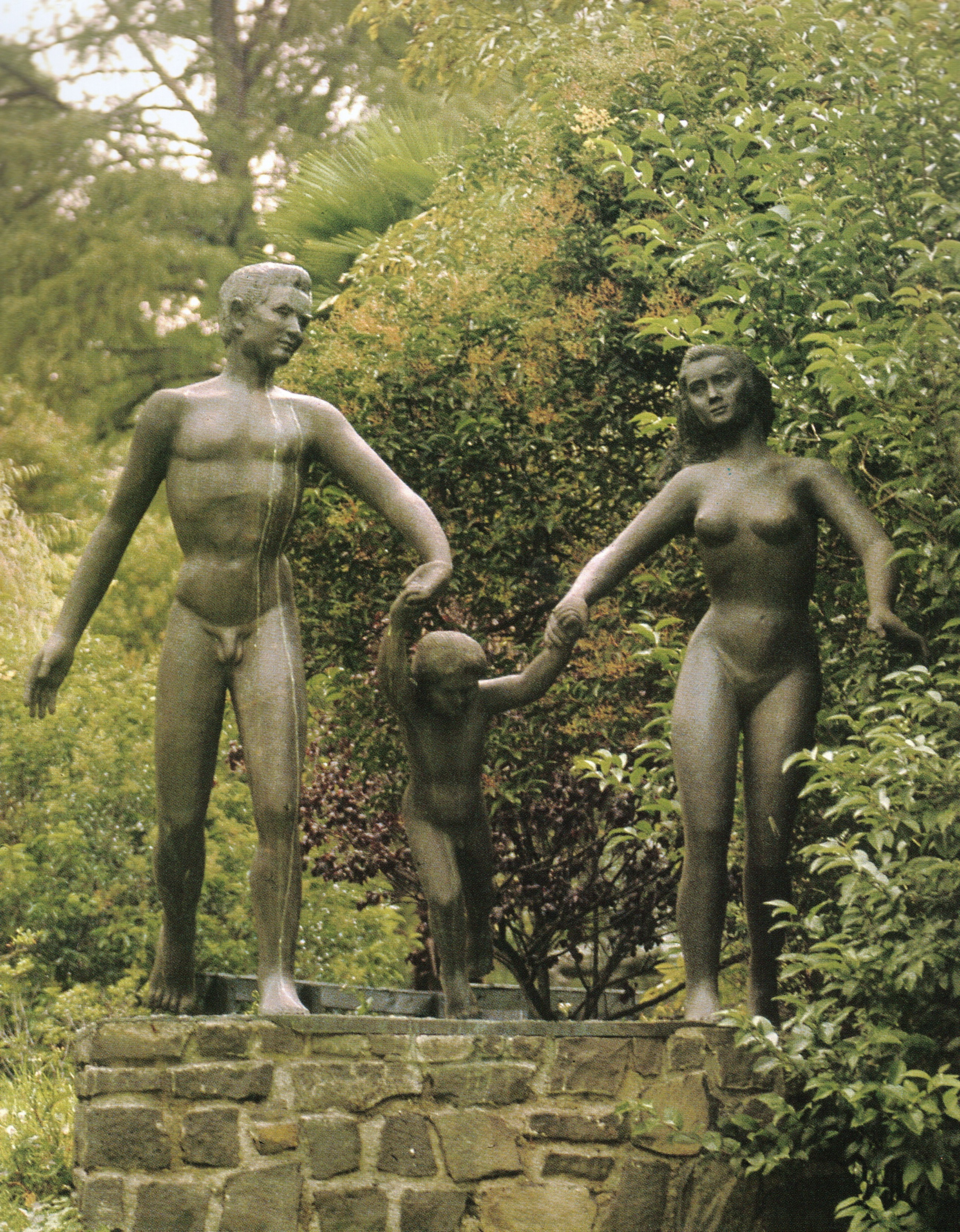
La Familia by Gogy Farias (1980), located in the third section of Bosque de Chapultepec

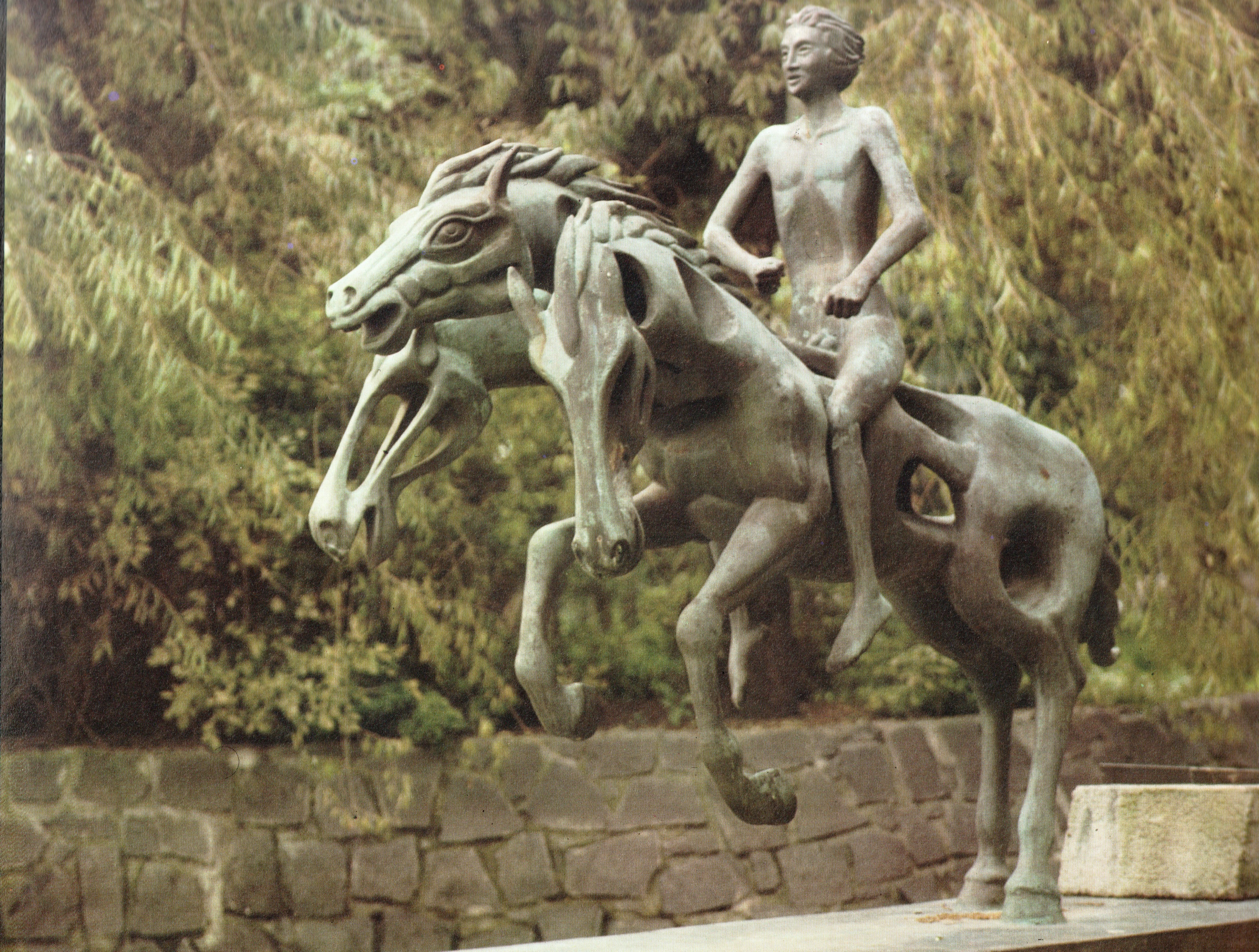
The Ruler (1980), by Gogy Farias, located in the Third Section

The third section of the park is located on the west side of the second and was inaugurated in 1974. It has a surface area of 242.9 hectares. It is the least developed and least visited; it is filled with trees and wildlife. Although some recreational activities such as archery and horseback riding are practiced there, the importance of this area is primarily as an ecological preserve for various species of flora and fauna, such as snakes and lizards. In 1992, it was decreed as a Protected Natural Area. In 2010, there were reports of feral dogs attacking visitors in the third section. Approximately 150 feral dogs were living in the small canyon areas of this section that year.

== Fourth section ==
The fourth section is the westernmost zone and it was inaugurated in 2021. It has a surface of 74 hectares. It was donated by the SEDENA.

== See also ==
- Chapultepec Peace Accords
