= Felipe Santiago Xicoténcatl =

Mexican military offcier (1804–1847)

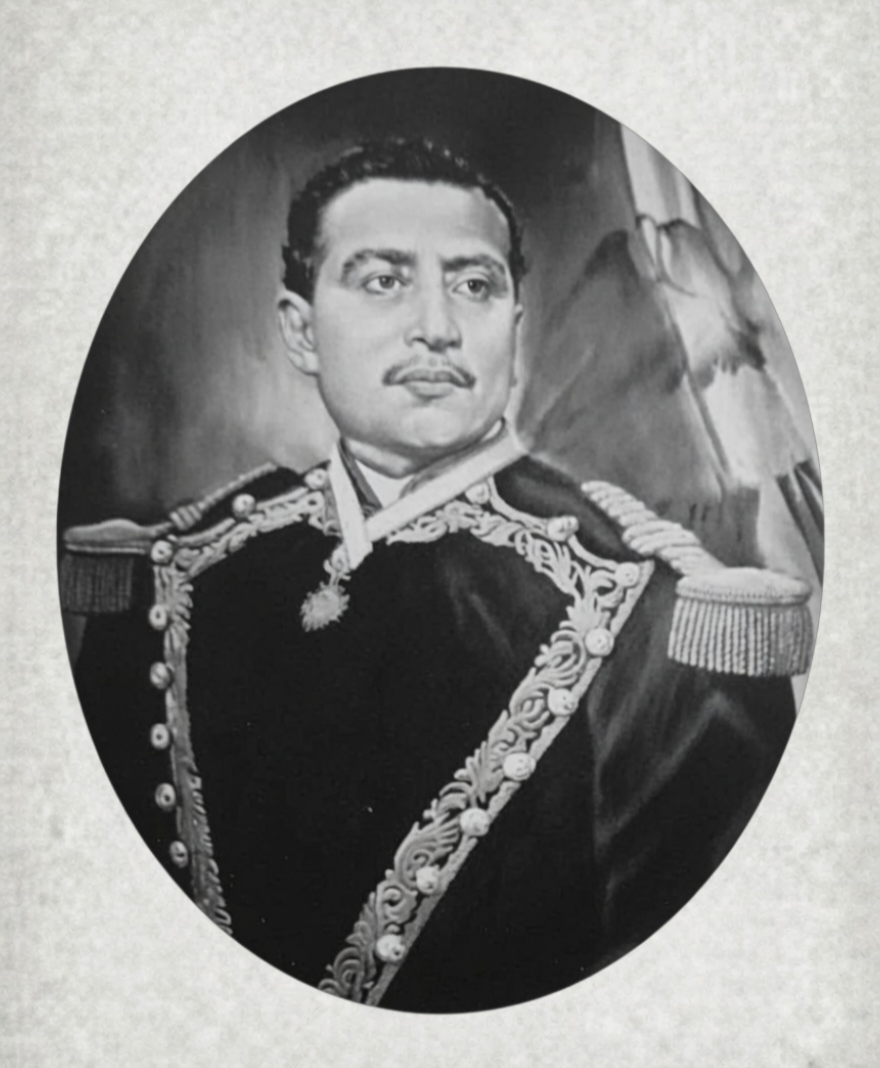
- Posthumous portrait
- Born: Felipe Santiago Tetlalmatzin Saldaña; 1 May 1804; Contla, Kingdom of Mexico, Viceroyalty of New Spain (now Tlaxcala, Mexico)
- Died: 13 September 1847 (aged 43); San Miguel Chapultepec, Mexico City
- Cause of death: Killed in action
- Burial place: Altar a la Patria
- Military career
- Allegiance: Mexico
- Branch: Mexican Army
- Service years: 1822–1847
- Rank: Colonel (posthumously)
- Commands: Batallón de San Blas
- Conflicts: Caste War of Yucatán; Mexican–American War; Battle of Buena Vista; Battle of Cerro Gordo; Battle of Chapultepec †
- Awards: Medal of honor for the defenders of the Battle of Chapultepec

Felipe Santiago Xicoténcatl (also spelled Xicohténcatl; born Felipe Santiago Tetlalmatzin Saldaña; 1 May 1804 – 13 September 1847) was a Tlaxcalan Nahua military officer in the Mexican Army. He is best remembered for his command of the Batallón Activo Guardacostas de San Blas during the Mexican–American War and for his last stand during the Battle of Chapultepec, where according to contemporary accounts and later tradition he was mortally wounded while defending his unit's flag, reportedly wrapping himself in it to prevent its capture by U.S. forces.

== Early life ==
Born Felipe Santiago Tetlalmatzin Saldaña on 1 May 1804, in San Bernardino Contla, Tlaxcala, to indigenous parents Alejandro Tetlalmatzin and Pascuala Saldaña. The family belonged to the Nahua community. He enlisted in the National Guard of Tlaxcala around 1822. To advance his military career, he adopted the surnames Xicoténcatl from an uncle who was a soldier and associate of President Vicente Guerrero. Over the following decades he participated in the frequent civil conflicts, federalist revolts, and campaigns that marked Mexico’s early independence period. These included operations linked to the Caste War in Yucatán.

== Mexican–American War ==
During the Mexican–American War, Xicoténcatl first saw action at the Battle of Buena Vista, where he was wounded. After recovery in Guadalajara and assignment in San Luis Potosí, he received command of the San Blas Battalion and lead the unit at the Battle of Cerro Gordo.

=== Battle of Chapultepec and death ===
By September 1847, U.S. forces under General Winfield Scott were advancing on Mexico City and the San Blas Battalion was ordered to support the defense of Chapultepec Castle, a key position protecting Mexico's capital. With roughly 400 men, the battalion fought tenaciously in the woods and on slopes.

According to longstanding Mexican historical tradition, when the battalion’s standard-bearer fell, Xicoténcatl seized the flag. He was wounded multiple times, with some accounts specifying a total of fourteen bullet wounds. Wrapped in the flag, he fell while still exhorting resistance from his men. His surviving soldiers carried him to the nearby chapel of San Miguel, where he died. The battalion was largely destroyed. He was posthumously promoted to colonel. His body, wrapped in the battalion flag, was initially buried in the chapel

== Legacy ==
The dress uniform of cadets of the Heroic Military Academy has foourteen buttons, purportedly representing the bullet wounds sustained by Xicoténcatl.

In 1947, on the 100th anniversary of the Battle of Chapultepec, his remains were exhumed, cremated, and placed in a silver urn in the central position of the Altar a la Patria at the entrance to Chapultepec Park. He is noted as the highest-ranking officer interred there.

In 2025 initiatives led by Senator Anabell Ávalos Zempoalteca called for greater national recognition. Specific requests to SEDENA included reviewing his posthumous rank and any pending decorations.

Parallel calls were made to the Government of Tlaxcala to continue honoring him and promote knowledge of his correct name and biography. These efforts frame him as a Tlaxcalan hero whose story enriches national memory of indigenous and regional contributions to Mexico

== See also ==
- Batallón de San Blas
- Niños Héroes
