= Amado Aguirre Santiago =

Mexican general and politician

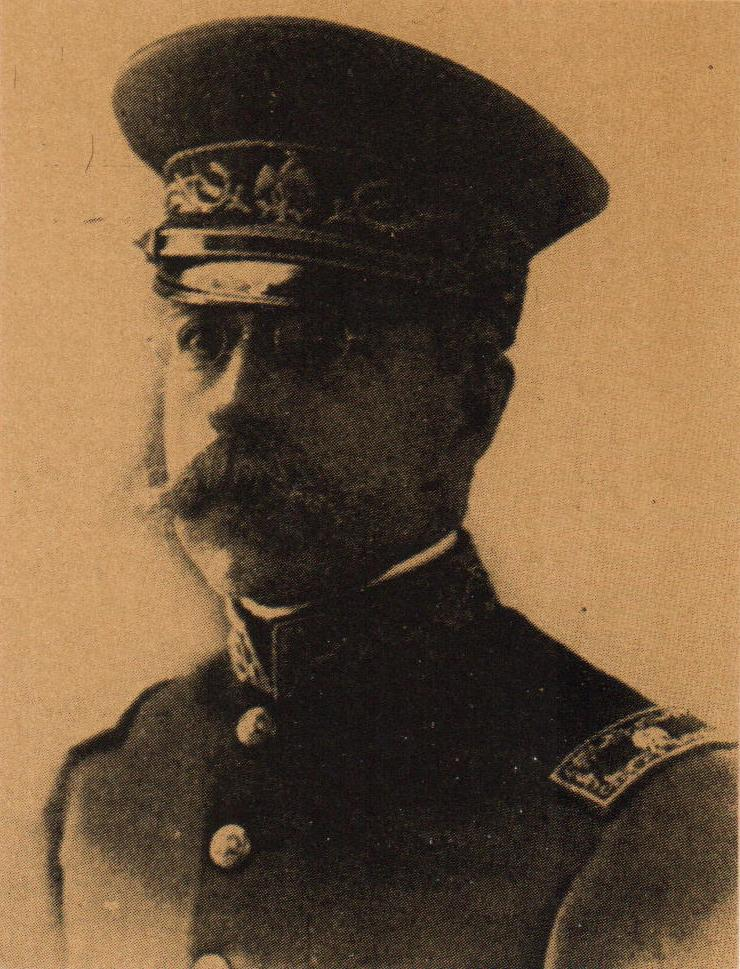
- Born: February 3/8, 1863; San Sebastián, Jalisco, Mexico
- Died: August 22, 1949 (aged 86); Mexico City, Mexico
- Occupation(s): general and politician

Amado Aguirre Santiago (February 3 or 8, 1863 – August 22, 1949) was a Mexican general and politician.

== Biography ==
Aguirre was born in 1863 in San Sebastián, Jalisco, the son of Ignacio Aguirre Peña, the first municipal president of San Sebastián, and Mariana Santiago Lope. He graduated from the mining engineering program in Guadalajara. During the Mexican Revolution, he fought under General Manuel M. Diéguez, and later joined General Álvaro Obregón. He held a number of positions in the Mexican government, at various levels. From 1916 to 1917, he was a constituent deputy, then military commander of Guadalajara, interim governor of Jalisco, member of the inspection commission of the army, senator during the 27th Congress, undersecretary of agriculture and development (Spanish: Subsecretario de Agricultura y Fomento, and president of the Comité Nacional Obregonista, manager of the Caja de Préstamos. He was Secretary of Communications and Public Works from 1921 to 1924, and was governor and military commander of the Federal Territory of Quintana Roo from 1924 to 1925, ambassador to Chile and representative to Brazil and Costa Rica, governor and military commander of the Baja California Sur district from 1927 to 1929, and director of the Heroico Colegio Militar in 1925.

He died in Mexico City in 1949.

Military offices
Preceded by Manuel Mendoza Sarabia	Director of the Heroico Colegio Militar; 1925	Succeeded by Miguel M. Acosta Guajardo
Government offices
Preceded by Pascual Ortiz Rubio	Secretary of Communications and Public Works; 1921–1924	Succeeded by Adalberto Tejeda
Preceded by Enrique Barocio Barrios	Governor of the Federal Territory of Quintana Roo; 1925	Succeeded by Enrique Barocio Barrios
Preceded by Daniel Galindo	Governor of Baja California Sur; 1927–1929	Succeeded by Agustín Olachea Avilés
