= Batallón de San Blas =

Batallón Activo Guardacostas de San Blas
- Active: 1823–1848
- Country: Mexico
- Branch: Mexican Army
- Type: Infantry
- Engagements: Mexican–American War * Battle of Cerro Gordo * Battle of Chapultepec

Commanders
- Colonel of the Regiment: Felipe Santiago Xicoténcatl

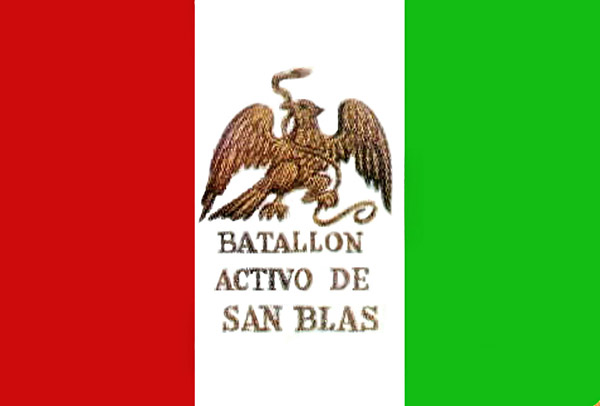

The San Blas Battalion was a Mexican infantry unit founded in 1823 in San Blas, Nayarit. Under the name Batallón Activo Guardacostas de San Blas (San Blas Active Coastguard Battalion), it saw action on several occasions culminating in the Mexican–American War. The battalion participated in the Battle of Chapultepec, where commanded by Lt. Colonel Felipe Santiago Xicoténcatl, aided in the defense of the Military Academy in the Chapultepec Castle. Of the 400 men comprising the battalion, only a few survived the battle.

It is said that Lt. Col. Xicoténcatl, refusing the idea of letting the American forces capture the Mexican flag identifying his battalion and severely wounded, wrapped himself with the flag and died beside his men. Nowadays, this flag is displayed in the National Museum of History located in Chapultepec Castle.

An inscription below it reads as follows:

La defensa del Castillo de Chapultepec estuvo bajo la responsabilidad del general Nicolás Bravo, quien disponía de 200 cadetes del Colegio Militar y 300 soldados del Batallón de San Blas, al mando del teniente coronel Felipe Santiago Xicoténcatl, que trató de contener a los invasores en el bosque.

Aniquilado el batallón de San Blas, los norteamericanos embistieron por el poniente y el sur del Colegio Militar, donde fueron detenidos durante algunas horas por los cadetes; pero más tarde las divisiones de Quitman y Pillow lograron escalar el cerro a costa de muchas bajas mortales.

Translation:

The Defense of Chapultepec Castle was under the responsibility of General Nicolás Bravo, who used 200 cadets of the Military Academy and 300 soldiers of the San Blas battalion under the command of lieutenant colonel Felipe Santiago Xicoténcatl and tried to stop the invaders in the woods.

With the San Blas Battalion annihilated, the Americans pushed on the western and southern wings of the Castle, where they were stopped for some hours by the cadets, even though later the divisions of Quitman and Pillow managed to ascend the hill at the cost of many casualties.
