= Battle of Chapultepec =

1847 battle of the Mexican–American War

- Part of the Mexican–American War
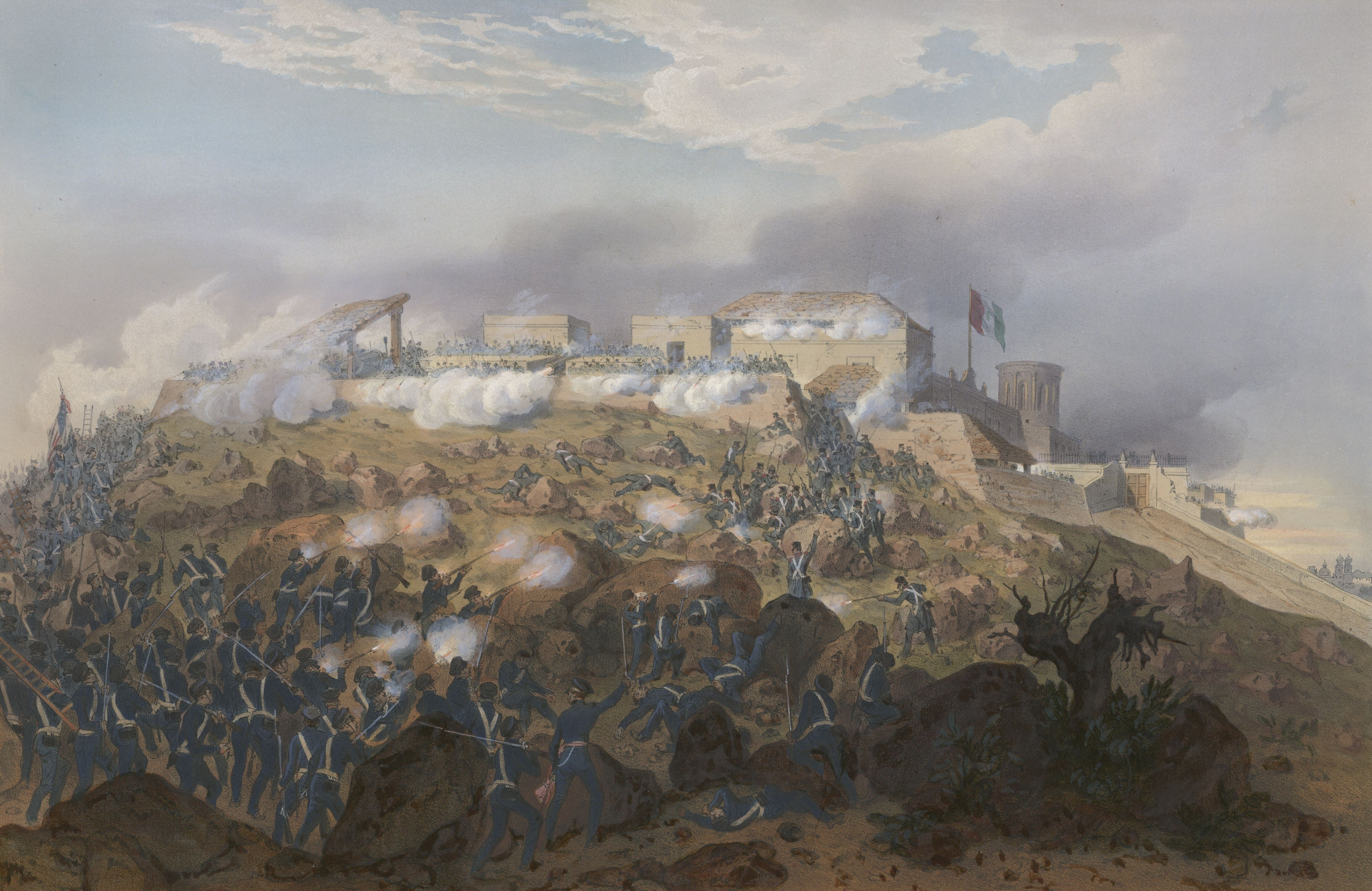
- Illustration of the battle by Carl Nebel
Date	September 12–13, 1847
Location	Chapultepec Castle, Mexico City 19.42037°N 99.18153°W
Result	American victory

Belligerents
United States	Mexico

Commanders and leaders
Winfield Scott	Santa Anna; Nicolás Bravo; Felipe Xicoténcatl †

Strength
2,000	832

Casualties and losses
138 killed 673 wounded 29 missing	c. 200~ killed c. 632 wounded or captured

The Battle of Chapultepec took place between U.S. troops and Mexican forces holding the strategically located Chapultepec Castle on the outskirts of Mexico City on September 13, 1847 during the Mexican–American War. The castle was built atop a 200-foot (61 m) hill in 1783, and in 1833 it was converted into a military academy and a gunpowder storage facility. The hill was surrounded by a wall 1,600 yards long.

The battle was one of the most pivotal battles during the Mexican–American War as it paved the way to seize Mexico City and led to a decisive American victory. On the U.S. side the army was headed by General Winfield Scott, who led a force totaling 7,200 men. The Mexican side was led by General Antonio López de Santa Anna, commander of the Mexican army, who had formed an army of approximately 25,000 men. Chapultepec Castle was defended by General Nicholas Bravo and his infantry of approximately 832 men, including military cadets of the Military Academy. They defended the position at Chapultepec against 2,000 U.S. troops. The Mexicans' loss opened the way for the U.S. to take the center of Mexico City.

This battle proved to be significant win for American forces as it led to the eventual occupation of Mexico City. However, the story at Chapultepec cemented itself in Mexican history, as an act of bravery by six young cadets known as the Niños Héroes, who leapt to their deaths rather than die at the hands of American forces. According to legend, one of the cadets wrapped himself in the Mexican flag as he jumped so it would not be captured by the U.S. Marines. Although it lasted only about 60–90 minutes, the battle has great importance in the histories of both countries.

== Scott's campaign to take Mexico City ==
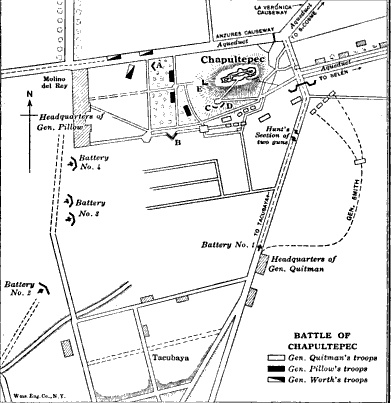
Disposition of forces

Scott marched inland from the port of Veracruz, going beyond his supply lines, which was seen as risky. He had fought a major battle at Cerro Gordo but had encountered little resistance in capturing Mexico's second-largest city, Puebla. After his win, he made his way to Mexico City. Scott avoided the direct route from Puebla to Mexico City due to the heavily defended road to El Peñon. Instead, he took a shortcut, looping south of Lake Chalco and Lake Xochimilco to the town of San Agustín. The Mexican defenders blocked the route to the capital at Hacienda of San Antonio, with marshes to their north and a lava field to the south, known as the Pedregal. General Gideon Johnson Pillow's division cut a road for artillery through the Pedregal to engage the entrenched Mexican forces under General Gabriel Valencia at Contreras on the 20th of August. The Mexicans were rerouted and the U.S. forces pressed on. Santa Anna fortified the ex-convent at Churubusco and fierce fighting took place. A two-week armistice followed the battle and even though it was an American win, the losses were heavy on both sides.

On September 8, 1847, Scott ordered William Worth to use his force of 3,250 men against the Molino del Rey building, approximately 1,000 yards from the castle itself. This was known as the costly Battle of Molino del Rey, where U.S. forces had managed to drive the Mexicans from their positions near the base of Chapultepec Castle guarding Mexico City from the west. Around 2,000 Mexican soldiers were killed or wounded in this battle. Army engineers surveyed the land to find the southern causeways to the city as they were still 1,000 yards from Mexico City, and both causeways led to Chapultepec castle. General Scott held a council of war with his generals and engineers on September 11. Mexico City was fortified with a series of canals and gates serving as customs checkpoints and Scott favored attacking Chapultepec; and only General David E. Twiggs agreed. This was because it would offer a less hazardous route to the capital compared to the heavily fortified southern gates. However, the majority of Scott's officers favored the attack through the southern gates, including Captain Robert E. Lee. A young lieutenant, P. G. T. Beauregard, gave a speech that persuaded General Franklin Pierce to change his vote in favor of the Western attack. Given that Mexican forces defended fortified positions tenaciously and had inflicted severe casualties on U.S. forces at Molino del Rey and Cerro Gordo, the decision to attack Chapultepec was not taken lightly.

== Santa Anna's defense of Chapultepec ==
General Lopez de Santa Anna was in command of the army at Mexico City and understood that Chapultepec Castle was an important position to defend the entrance to the city. Chapultepec Castle was not intended to be used as a fortress but planned as a luxury residence for viceroy Matías de Gálvez y Gallardo in 1784, and completed by his son Bernardo de Gálvez. It was strategically positioned with a 1,600-yard-long wall that was about 15 feet high. The castle sat atop a 200-ft-tall hill and had been converted to the Mexican Military Academy (Colegio Militar) in 1841. Although Santa Anna's total forces defending Mexico City were larger than Scott's, he had to defend multiple positions since he was unaware of where the attack would come from. He did not have enough troops to effectively defend both the southern causeways into Mexico City and Chapultepec Castle at a distance from the capital. Steps were taken by Mexican forces to stop the US advance onto Mexico City. The academy was led by General José Mariano Monterde, who defended their position with about 100 cadets and a small number of defenders who had survived previous battles. The defense was supported by the San Blas Battalion, commanded by Colonel Felipe Santiago Xicoténcatl. The position was under the command of General Nicolás Bravo, a hero of the War of Independence. In May 1847, bells were melted down to be turned into cannonballs. By the time US forces approached Chapultepec, American victories had significantly depleted the Mexican army's artillery reserves. The walls of Chapultepec castle were fortified with sandbags, stout beams and shallow trenches by digging.

The majority of Santa Anna's army was made up of indigenous people who lacked the weaponry and training for battle. The Mexican Army faced significant challenges in terms of equipment and resources compared to the U.S. Army. Mexican accounts note the inferior quality of their clothing, citing outdated muskets and poorly constructed cannons. The castle's garrison consisted of a mix of regular Mexican soldiers and cadets from the Military Academy. On September 11, before the battle, Colonel Nicolás Bravo ordered the evacuation of all cadets, of whom there were around 200. Many obeyed, some were taken home by their families, but about 50 cadets requested to stay and defend their school. This group was joined by several recently graduated cadets who had not yet been assigned to the National Army, as well as 19 administrative personnel, including the director, instructors, teachers, and even the school's quartermaster.

== Battle ==
At Chapultepec, General Nicolás Bravo had fewer than 1,000 men (832 total including 250 from the 10th Infantry, 115 from the Querétaro Battalion, 277 from the Mina Battalion, 211 from the Union Battalion, 27 from the Toluca Battalion and 42 from the Patria Battalion) and only seven guns (Gen. Manuel Gamboa with two 24-lb, one 8-lb, three 4-lb. and one howitzer) to hold the hill. These forces also included about 200 cadets, some as young as 13 years old. Also defending the castle was the Batallón de San Blas under the command of Lieutenant Colonel Felipe Xicoténcatl, a hero of the battle, along with six cadets who died defending the castle. Thinking that the attack would come from the south, Santa Anna devoted preparation time and troops there, both before and during the bombardment. He did not realize his mistake until the U.S. troops were actually on the hill, but it was too late for reinforcements.

U.S. forces used its heavy artillery to bombard the castle before the infantry attacked. Chapultepec Castle was not intended to be used as a fortress and thus the 15-foot stone walls were still vulnerable to cannon fire as the buildings were not built to withstand artillery. Scott's plan involved simultaneous attacks from multiple directions. The Mexican forces had attempted to fortify the defenses by digging shallow trenches and placing sandbags, but this was not sufficient. During the artillery bombardment, the defenders had nowhere to shelter and they had no way to defend against this attack from a distance. Destruction of the walls, sandbags, and other defenses was demoralizing for many defenders, and some began abandoning their positions, less than half had deserted. Santa Anna, with part of the army, was repelling another attack at the entrance to the Chapultepec Forest, east of the hill, and failed to realize that the main assault on the castle was coming from the west until it was too late. The San Blas Battalion, with only 400 men, faced the divisions of Worth, Quitman, and Pillow at the foot of the hill, fighting until nearly all were killed. Only when the bombardment went on all day did Santa Anna realize the main attack was to be on Chapultepec. If he sent forces there, they would be exposed to U.S. fire in the flat land below the hill, and they could not reach the hill to help the defenders there during the bombardment. Santa Anna consulted with Nicolás Bravo, confessing to him that many of his demoralized troops were also likely to melt away if sent into a situation that would result in high casualties.

The U.S. Army took the former Archbishop's Palace in Tacubaya as their base of operations. Scott organized two storming parties of about 250 men each, including 40 Marines. The first party consisted of Captain Samuel Mackenzie's 256 men from Gideon Pillow's division, who would advance from the Molino east up the hill. The second storming party consisted of Captain Silas Casey's men from John A. Quitman's division, advancing along the Tacubaya Road, but Casey was replaced by Major Levi Twiggs. Only Twiggs' division and Bennett Riley's brigade were left on the American right flank.

The U.S. forces began an artillery barrage against Chapultepec at 7:00 am on September 12 which lasted all day. It was halted at dark and resumed at first light on September 13. At 8:00 am, the bombardment was halted and General Scott ordered the infantry attack. Three assault columns formed. On the left were the 11th and 14th Infantry under Colonel William Trousdale moving east along the Anzures aqueduct, in the center were four companies of the Voltigeur regiment under Colonel Timothy Patrick Andrews along with the 9th under Colonel Truman Bishop Ransom and the 15th Infantry all moving through the swamp and western edge of the grove, and on the right were the remaining four Voltigeur companies under Lieutenant Colonel Joseph E. Johnston.

Pillow was shot in the foot and called for reinforcements, which came from John A. Quitman's division, but the attack faltered when fired upon by the Morelia Battalion battery. Pillow's command fell to General Cadwallader. Andrews's column cleared the grove of Mexican troops and linked up with Johnston. The attack by the 9th and 15th Infantries stalled waiting for scaling ladders, and Col. Truman B. Ransom, commander of the 9th Infantry, was killed.

Quitman sent Persifor Smith's brigade to his right and brought in James Shields, plus the New York and 2d Pennsylvania Regiments into the assault. At the same time, Newman S. Clarke's brigade arrived on the western slope, as did the scaling ladders. The Voltigeurs soon planted their flag on the parapet.

By 9:00 am, General Bravo surrendered to the New York Regiment, and the American flag flew over the castle. Santa Anna watched the Americans take Chapultepec, while an aide exclaimed, "let the Mexican flag never be touched by a foreign enemy". He also exclaimed, "I believe if we were to plant our batteries in Hell, the damned Yankees would take them from us."

=== Los Niños Héroes ===
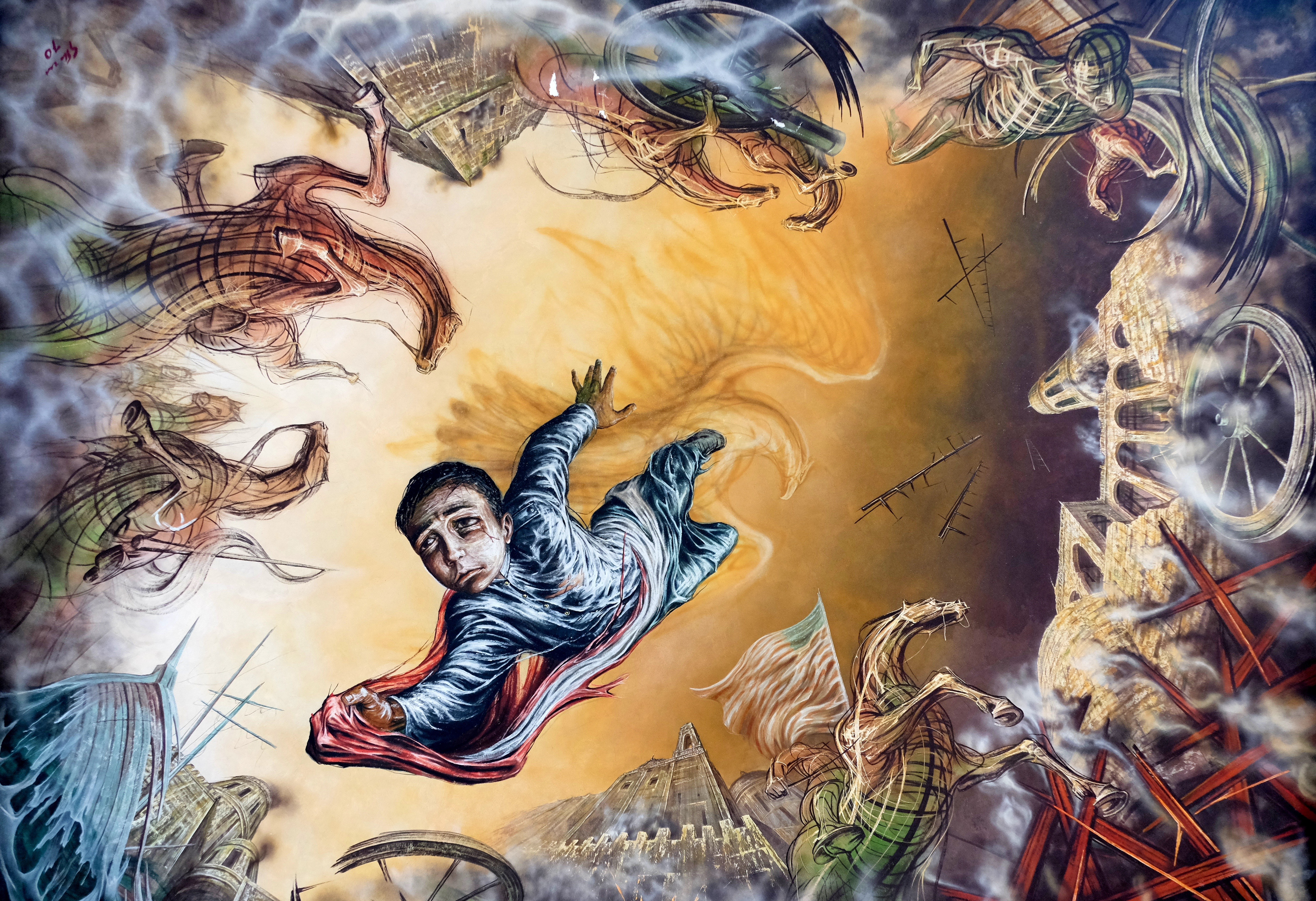
Painting on a ceiling of the Chapultepec Castle by Gabriel Flores depicting Juan Escutia leaping from the castle walls to his death, wrapped in the Mexican flag in order to prevent the flag from falling into U.S. hands.

Though Mexico undeniably lost the battle, the Battle of Chapultepec is a huge part of Mexican history and heritage. The day is commemorated as a national holiday due to the stories and legends produced. During the battle, five Mexican military cadets, and one of their instructors, refused to fall back when General Bravo ordered a retreat; they fought to the death. These were teniente (lieutenant) Juan de la Barrera and cadets Agustín Melgar, Juan Escutia, Vicente Suárez, Francisco Márquez, and Fernando Montes de Oca, all between the ages of 13 and 20. According to legend, the last of the six, Juan Escutia, grabbed the Mexican flag, wrapped it around himself, and jumped off the castle point to prevent the flag from falling into enemy hands. However, recent historians confirm that Escutia was actually a twenty-year-old soldier in the San Blas Battalion, not a cadet. He was also not a child at the time of the battle and there is no historical evidence to support the flag-leaping narrative. The official narrative about their actions, first promoted in 1852 and gaining greater prominence during the Porfiriato and in 1947, was shaped with nationalist purposes, turning their story into a heroic myth.

In 1967, Gabriel Flores painted a mural depicting Los Niños Héroes. The mural decorates the ceiling of the palace, showing Escutia wrapped in the flag, apparently falling from above. This moment became cemented in Mexican history as a symbol of Mexican patriotism and resistance against foreign aggression. A monument stands in Chapultepec Park commemorating their courage and they are celebrated for their patriotism. Their remains are said to be interred at the Altar to the Fatherland, a site intended to solidify the Niños Héroes' place in Mexican memory. This was said to have occurred during a 1947 excavation that claimed to have uncovered the cadets’ remains, however there is no evidence to support this claim. The cadets are eulogized and became martyrs in Mexican history as los Niños Héroes, the Child Heroes or Heroic Cadets.

=== Saint Patrick's Battalion ===
During General Zachary Taylor's campaign along the Rio Grande, a significant number of U.S. soldiers~~,~~ deserted and fled to Mexico. Mexican authorities offered incentives for these deserters to join their ranks, and they formed the Batallon de San Patricio. Thirty men from the Saint Patrick's Battalion, a group of former United States Army soldiers who joined the Mexican side, were executed en masse during the battle for their desertion. These men were historically Irish soldiers, who held no loyalty to the U.S. army. They had been previously captured at the Battle of Churubusco. Colonel William S. Harney specified that they were to be hanged with Chapultepec in view and that the precise moment of their death was to occur when the U.S. flag replaced the Mexican tricolor atop the citadel, which occurred at 9:30 am that morning.

=== Battles for the Belén and San Cosmé Gates ===
The fall of Chapultepec led to a key engagement known as the Battle of San Belen and Cosme Gate, which was part of the U.S. assault on Mexico City in September 1847. The battle involved coordinated attacks by General Winfield Scott's forces on two entry points into the city: the San Cosme Gate and the Belén Gate. General Scott arrived at the castle and was mobbed by cheering American soldiers following their victory. William J. Worth's division was sent by Scott to support Trousdale's men on La Verónica Causeway (now Avenida Melchor Ocampo) for the main attack against the San Cosme Gate. Defended by Gen. Rangel's Granaderos Battalion, part Matamoros, Morelia, and Santa Anna Battalions (Col. Gonzalez), part 3d Light (Lt. Col. Echeagaray), & 1st Light (Comdt. Marquez) Trousdale, followed by John Garland, Newman Clarke, and George Cadwalader's brigades, began advancing up the causeway.

Meanwhile, General Quitman quickly gathered the troops in Chapultepec, except the 15th Infantry, who guarded the castle and prisoners, and designed as a feint, headed down the Belén Causeway, stopping at the Belen Garita. The gate was manned by the Morelia Battalion, under the command of General Andrés Terrés' (three guns and 180 men: 2d Mexico Activos) and the paseo to the north by General Ramirez. Troops began to desert, and when Terres ran out of ammunition, he withdrew into the Ciudadela. Led by the Mounted Rifles (fighting on foot), Quitman breached the Belén Gate at 1:20 pm. General Scott later praised their effort, remarking, "Brave Rifles, you have gone through fire and come out steel".

Worth started his advance down the San Cosme causeway at 4:00 pm, having fended off an attack by 1,500 of Torrejon's cavalry. Garland's brigade used the arches of the aqueduct to advance on the right. Clarke's men on the right passed through a tunnel made by sappers. Lieutenant Ulysses S. Grant, and some 4th Infantry used the bell tower of San Cosme Church south of the causeway to place a dismounted mountain howitzer. On the north side of the road, naval officer Raphael Semmes repeated Grant's successful maneuver. Lt. George Terrett then led a group of U.S. Marines behind the Mexican defenders, and climbing to the roof, unleashed a deadly volley on the artillery gunners. By 6 pm, Worth had broken through the gate, and the defenders scattered, many retreating into the Ciudadela, sweeping Santa Anna along with them. As night fell, Worth lobbed five mortar rounds into the city, which fell near the National Palace.

== Aftermath ==
The capture of Chapultepec was a decisive victory for the U.S. Army, paving the way for the occupation of Mexico City the following day. The fall of Chapultepec also dealt a severe blow to the morale of the Mexican Army with many defecting. General Scott reports that approximately 20,000 Mexican soldiers deserted, leaving only small force. Scott rapidly advanced toward Mexico City, where the next battle would take place. Santa Anna had 5,000 troops in the Ciudadela (armory) and 7,000 in other parts of the city.He eventually surrendered, and Scott's army took control of the city. Six of Santa Anna's generals were taken prisoner, two of which were executed. The generals were Don Antonio Garcia the Captain of the National Guard of Jalapa and Don Ambrosia Alcade the Lieutenant of the 11th infantry regiment. There were approximately 3,730 Mexican prisoners. At 1 am the next day, Scott ordered a withdrawal to Guadalupe Hidalgo and by 7am, the American flag was flying over the Ciudadela. Mexico City fell on September 14, 1847. The public outrage against Santa Anna resulted in his leaving the presidency on September 26, 1847, and a provisional government was established. The Mexican–American War finally concluded on February 2, 1848, with the signing of the Treaty of Guadalupe Hidalgo. Mexico was forced to cede nearly half of their territory in return for 15 million dollars. The U.S. buried its dead in a plot of land at the corner of Circuitos Interior and Calzada de Tacubaya. This site was later declared a memorial park by the U.S. government and is now part of the U.S. Embassy grounds.

== Legacies ==
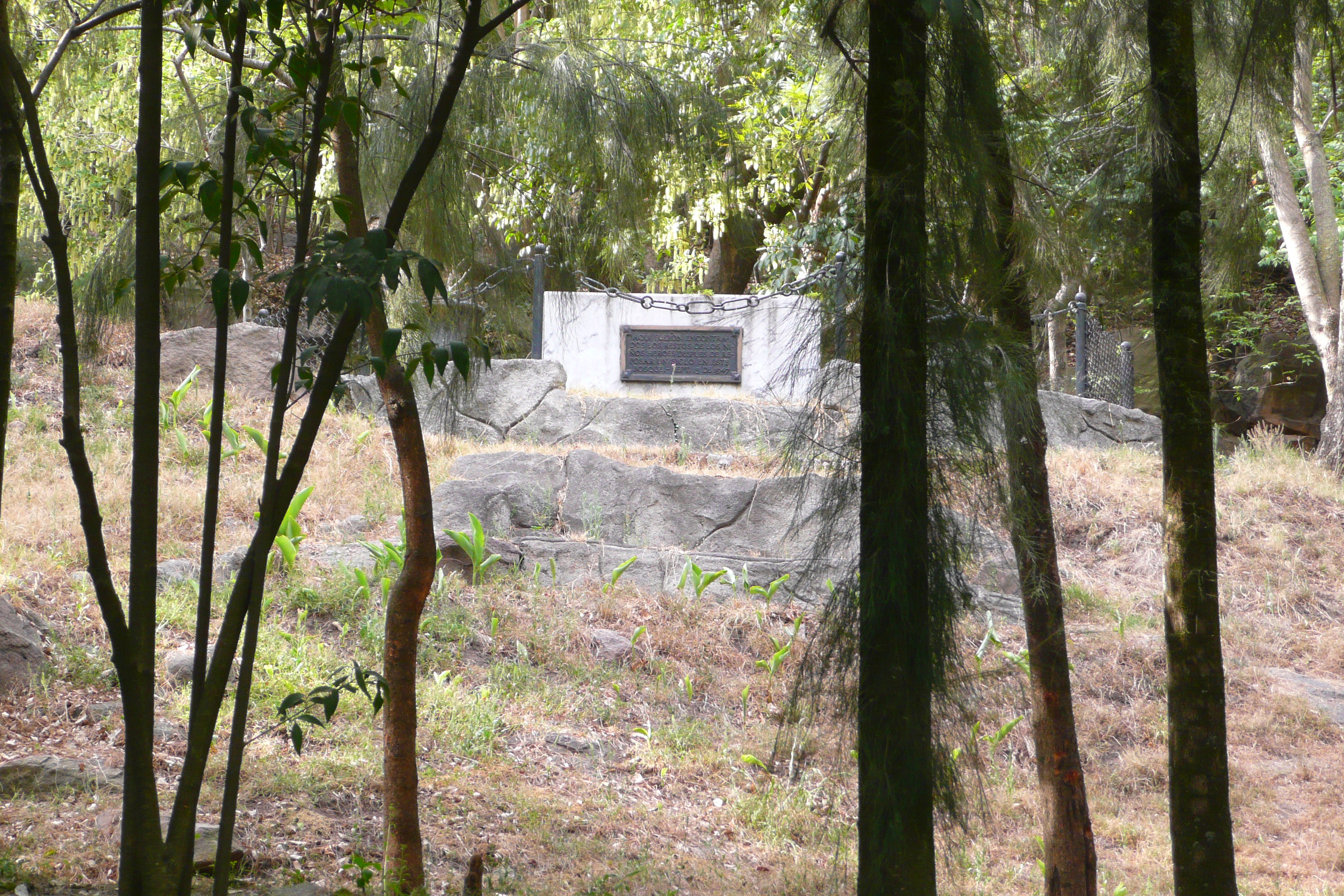
Plate and place where the remains of six Mexican soldiers were said to be found in Chapultepec in 1947

The efforts of the U.S. Marines in this battle and subsequent occupation of Mexico City are memorialized by the opening lines of the "Marines' Hymn", "From the Halls of Montezuma...".

Several lower-ranking U.S. Army officers participating in the invasion became key generals on both sides of the American Civil War, including Ulysses Grant, Daniel H. Hill, George Pickett, James Longstreet, John C. Pemberton, Thomas Jonathan "Stonewall" Jackson, James J. Archer, P. G. T. Beauregard, and Robert E. Lee.

U.S. Marine tradition maintains that the red stripe is worn on the trousers of the blue dress uniform, commonly known as the blood stripe, because many of the Marine NCOs and officers of the detachment died while storming the castle of Chapultepec in 1847. In fact, iterations of the stripe antedate the war. In 1849, the stripes were changed to a solid red from dark blue stripes edged in red, which dated from 1839. Additionally, the statement that the blood stripe honors the heavy casualties among Marines is false, as only 7 marines out of 400-450 died during the battle.

In Mexico, the battle has a complicated place in historical memory, since the capture of Chapultepec led to the fall of Mexico City to the invaders. The fierce defense of Chapultepec by military cadets at the Military Academy, six of whom are said to have died on heroic last stands when U.S. forces finally breached the castle. The Niños Héroes ("Boy Heroes") were considered martyrs fighting to maintain Mexico's honor as a nation and they are celebrated on September 13th. Their bravery and innocence was lauded in Mexico, as opposed to the Mexican Army generals, particularly Antonio López de Santa Anna, blamed for Mexico's defeat.

In 1871, former cadets who survived the battle established the Association of the Military College. They played an active role in preserving the memory of their fallen comrades, establishing associations and advocating for the recognition of their sacrifice.

In 1947, President Harry S. Truman laid a wreath on the 1881 cenotaph of the Niños Héroes as a gesture of goodwill after Mexico aided the U.S. in World War II.

== Gallery ==
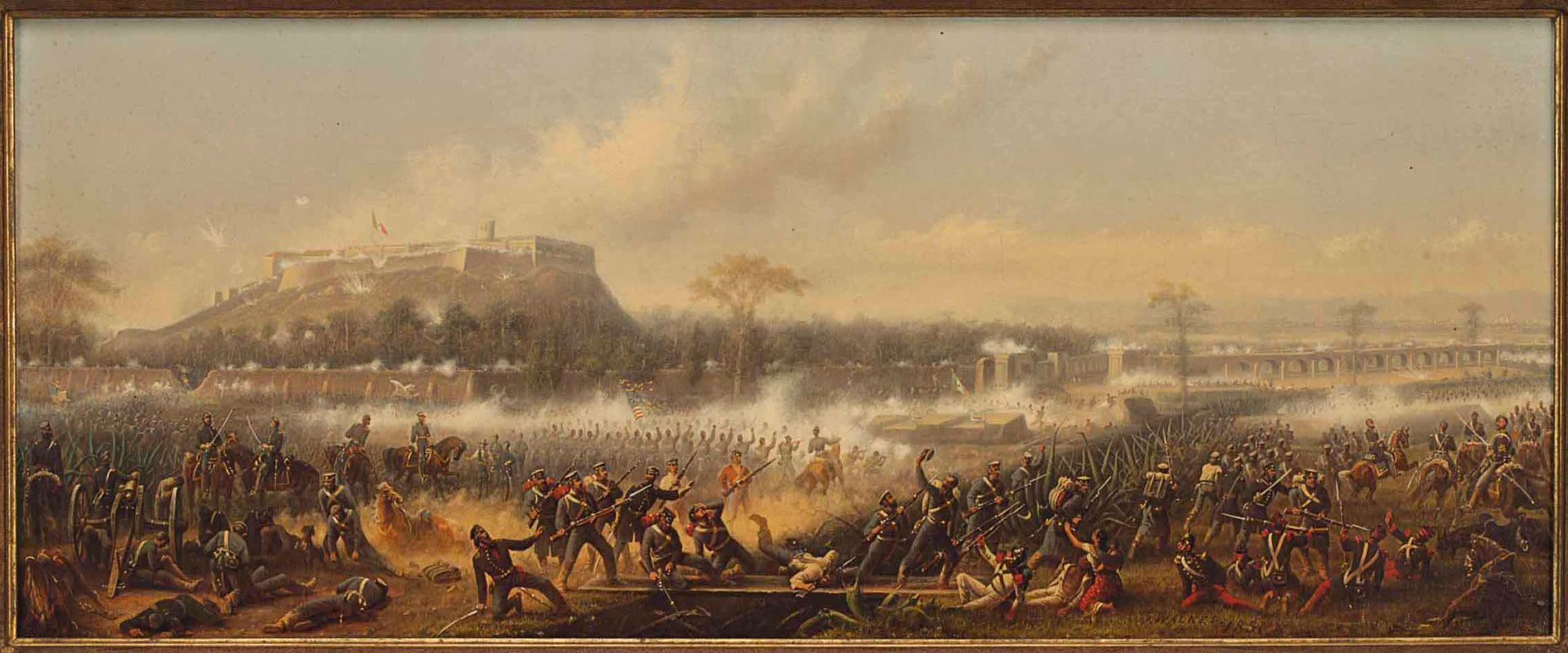
Battle of Chapultepec by James Walker, 1858

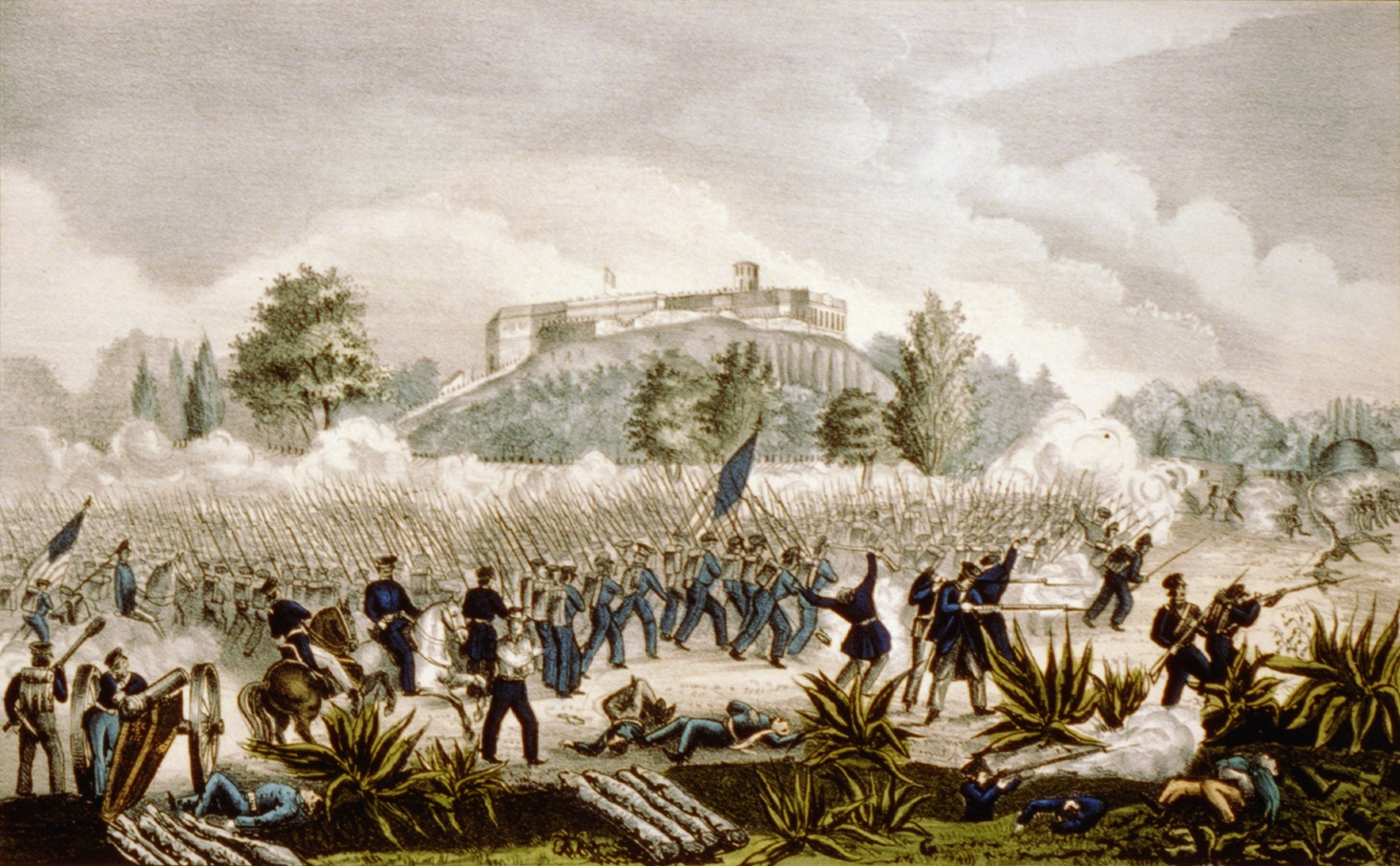
Attack on the Castle Chapultepec

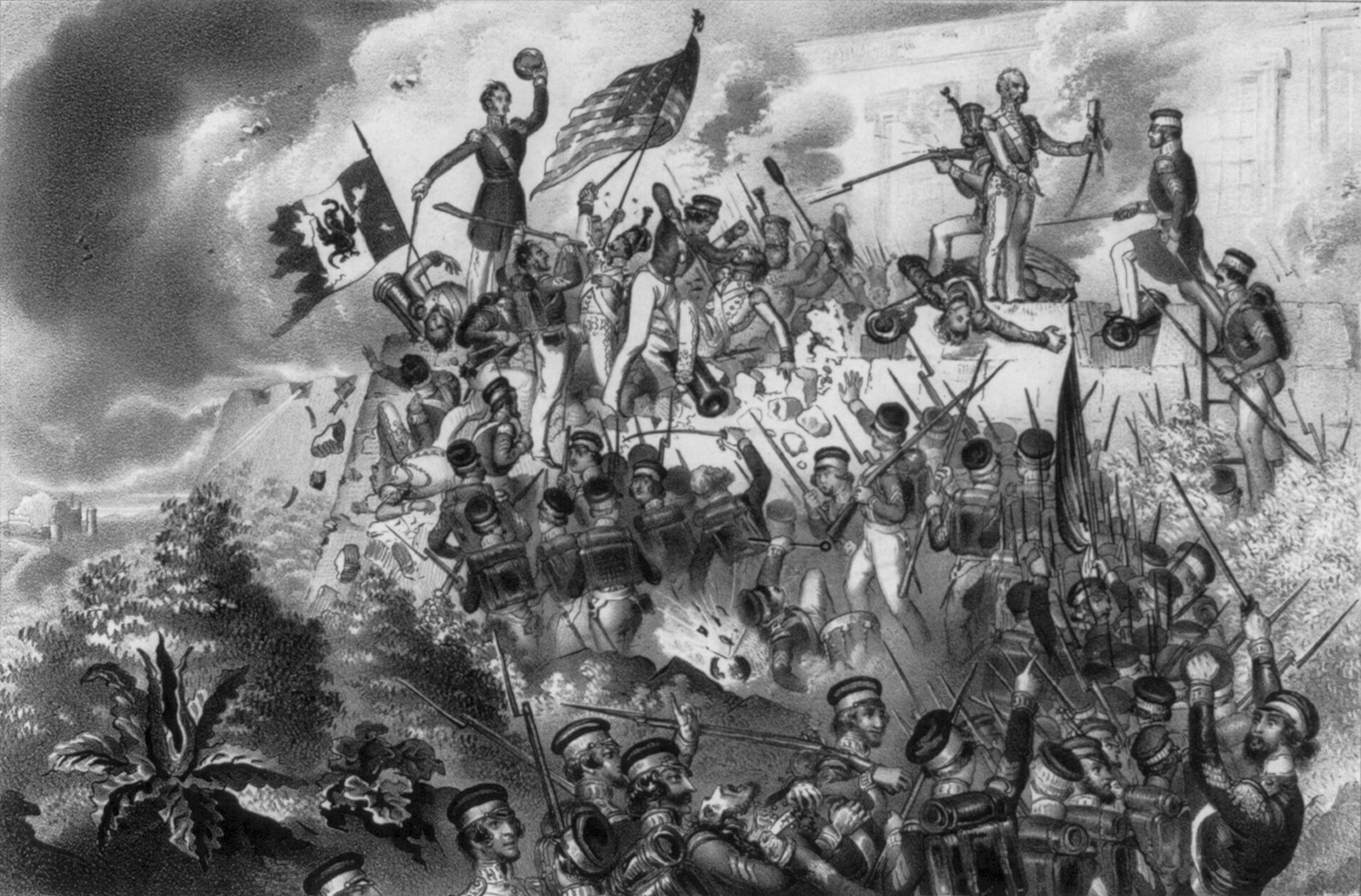
Storming of Chapultepec in Mexico

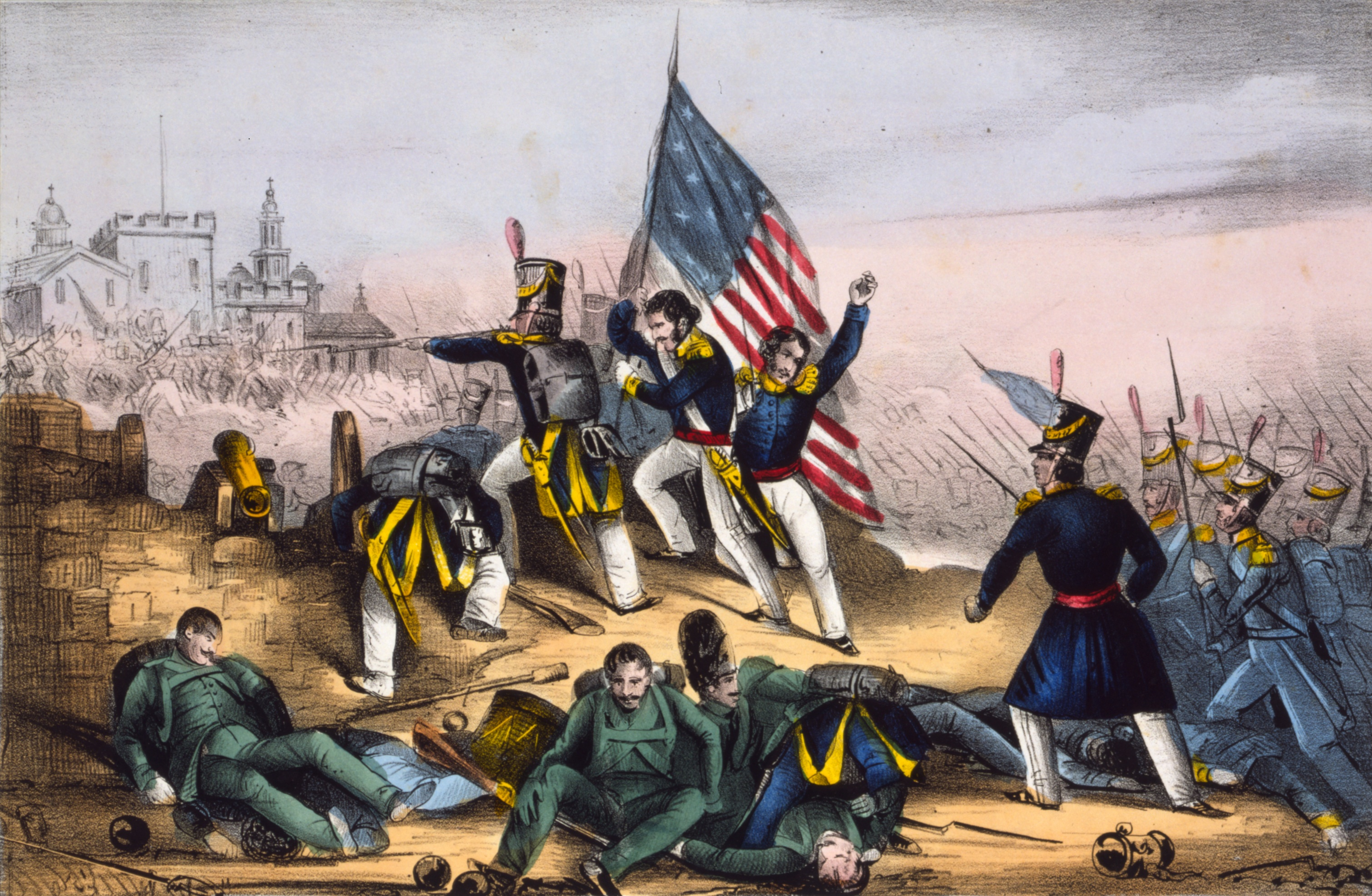
Attack on Chapultepec, Sept. 13, 1847

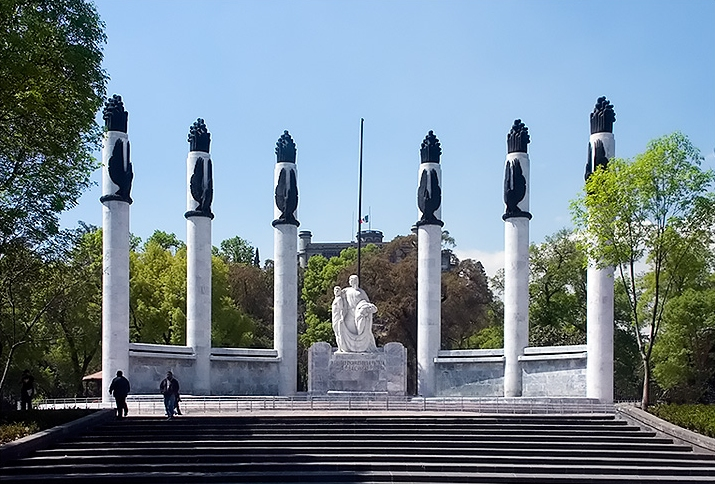
Monument to the six Heroic Cadets, with Chapultepec Castle in the background.

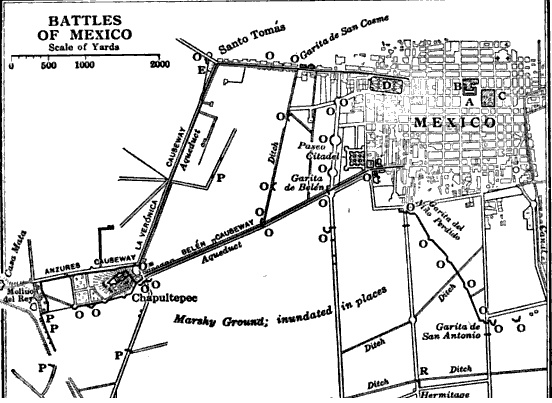
Molino del Rey is on the left. "O" depicts a Mexican battery, "P" an American battery, and "R" is Steptoe's battery.
