= Heroic Military Academy =

Military educational institution in Mexico

Heroico Colegio Militar (Mexico)
- Motto: Por el honor de México (For Mexico's Honor)
- Type: Public military university
- Established: 1823; 203 years ago
- Affiliations: Secretariat of National Defense
- Commandant of the Academy: Brigadier General Julio Álvarez Arellano
- Location: Tlalpan, Mexico City, Mexico; 19°15′30″N 99°9′2″W
- Mascot: Royal Eagle
- Website: Official

The Heroic Military College (officially in Spanish: Heroico Colegio Militar) is the major military educational institution in Mexico. It was founded in 1823 and located in the former Palace of the Inquisition in Mexico City. Initially designated as the Cadet Academy, it was renamed in 1823 as the Colegio Militar. The college was relocated in Perote, Veracruz, before being returned to Mexico City, where it was established in the Betlemitas monastery (today occupied by the Interactive Museum of the Economy and the Museum of the Mexican Army and Air Force). From 1835, the Military College was located in the Recogidas Building (destroyed by an earthquake in 1985). Cadets training for the Mexican Navy originally formed part of the student body, but in 1897, the Military Naval School was established as a separate institution in Veracruz.

The Military College comes under the supervision of the Mexican Army and Air Force University and the Army Military Education General Directorate.

== History ==
=== Foundation ===
Although plans for a military academy were proposed as early as 1818, only in 1822 were such plans materialized, with the efforts of Diego Garcia Conde, the ex-Spanish military officer then serving in the Mexican Army, and then plans for such an academy to be formed were approved by the Mexican imperial government, through the Imperial War Ministry.

In the middle of the year, Emperor Agustin de Iturbide ordered that the Former Inquisition Palace Complex become the headquarters of the now newly founded Military College of Mexico, the Military Cadet Academy, and the Engineers Training School, all under their first director, Brigadier Diego Garcia Conde. By the next year, through the orders of War Minister General Jose Joaquin de Herrera, the Military College of Mexico was relaunched as a separate academy with headquarters at San Carlos Fortress, in Perote, Veracruz state. In 1824, in compliance with an order from President Guadalupe Victoria, 18 cadets of the now called Perote Military College of Mexico, through the permission of then college director Col. Juan Dominguez y Galvez, became the first cadets of the new Naval Aspirants College and the Tlacotalpan Nautical School trained to be the Mexican Navy's future ship officers.

=== Early years ===
In 1828, due to a campaign against secret societies and Masonic lodges, Lt. Col. Manuel Montano's visit became the reason for the college's first loyalty act by the Corps of Cadets and its faculty, for their response to him was that the Military College should be exempted from the campaign because no one in the college's cadet rosters was either a secret society member nor Mason, and it turned into a national act of loyalty by the college cadets and faculty. As a result of this great deed, the college in March 1828 returned to Mexico City, first in the Bethelemitas convent and later in the Inquisition Palace Complex on July 1. By then, it began to be recognized by every Mexican as the nation's premier military educational institution.

The turmoil that sparked in the 1828 presidential elections took its toll on the college cadets. On September 11, a rebellion led by Generals Antonio Lopez de Santa Anna and Jose Maria Lobato denounced the election results ten days before, in which Manuel Gomez Pedraza emerged as the winner. Two months later, on November 30, they together with Lorenzo de Zavala and Col. Santiago Garcia staged a coup d'état that took over the La Acordada building demanding that the election results be voided by Congress. The same day, President Victoria called on the college cadets to proceed to the National Palace, and they fought on the side of the armed forces for 4 days until the fighting ended on December 4, with a compromise reached by both sides. Class resumed later the next day.

Political turmoil broke out again in 1840. On July 13 of that year Gen. Jose Urrea bolted out of jail and led a rebellion against President Anastacio Bustamante, who was later imprisoned in the presidential residence. General Gabriel Valencia then ordered all troops loyal to the President to proceed at once to the city citadel. These included the cadets of the Military College under its then director Brigade General Pedro Conde, who was received by Gen. Valencia and sent a delegation of cadets to the citadel. The college delegation then moved to a church where they fought anti-Bustamante troops, which resulted in two wounded cadets (Juan Rico and Antonio Groso), the former later died of his wounds sustained. On the 16th President Bustamante left his residence and Gen. Vicente Filisola arrived at the church premises. On that night, when an armistice was made, the attempted coup was already over.

The next year, it relocated to the Chalpultepec Castle in Mexico City. This castle was, in six years time, during the Mexican War, a place where 5 cadets and an officer in the faculty died in defense of the Mexican nation, and it gained the Heroic designation. After a few years, the college relocated to the Inquisition Palace and later to San Lucas.

In 1846, the college's only naval director, Graduate Ship Captain Francisco Garcia began his duties as College Commandant, a duty lasting until 1847. A sudden rebellion by the Corps of Cadets happened during his tenure.

=== The Niños Héroes ===
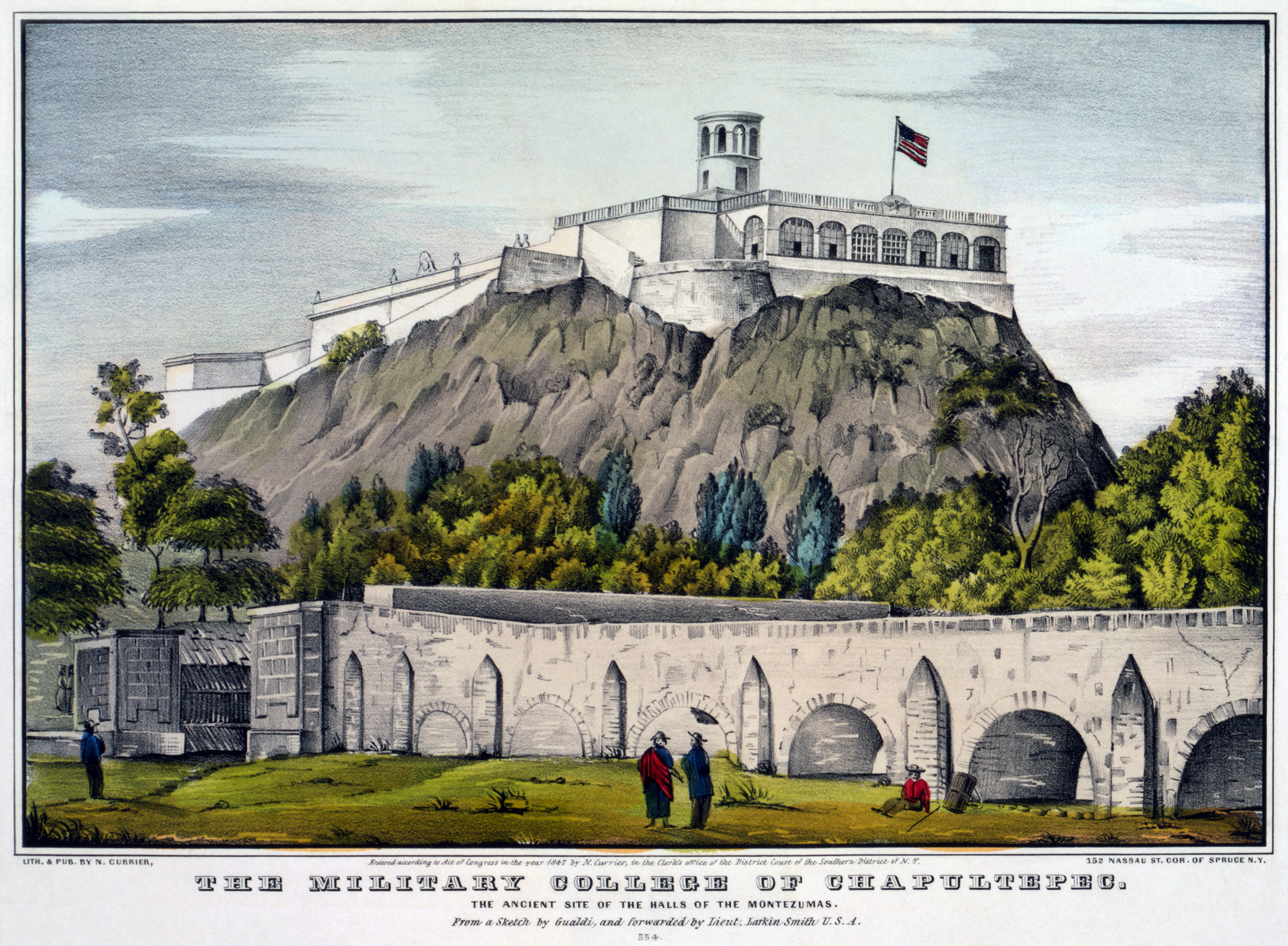
Military College of Chapultepec, hand tinted lithograph published by Nathaniel Currier, c. 1847. The flagpole holds a United States flag.

The following year (1847), during the first term of Col. José Mariano Monterde Segura as commandant, the Mexican–American War reached Mexico City and the Military Academy. On September 11 cadets of the Academy were involved in fighting on the Condress Estate. On September 13 Chapultepec Castle and its surroundings became the site of the historic Battle of Chapultepec. Its Mexican Army defenders, under the leadership of Nicolás Bravo, former President of the Republic and a veteran of the war of independence, included about 200 members of the Corps of Cadets, aged between 13 and 19. At the end of the battle five cadets – Juan Escutia (who reportedly leapt to his death wrapped in the Flag of Mexico), Agustin Melgar, Francisco Marquez, Fernando Montes de Oca, and Vicente Suárez – and faculty member Lieutenant Juan de la Barrera all refused to retreat and died in a final stand as the "young heroes" of Academy legend. An unknown proportion of the other cadets became casualties or prisoners during the earlier stages of the battle.

Each year on the anniversary of the battle, the sacrifice of the five Niños Héroes of the Military Academy is remembered nationwide, with a national ceremony at the monument with the Corps in attendance.

=== 1857–1920 ===
In 1858, during the term of Commandant Colonel Luis Tola Algarín, the college moved its facilities to the former Church of Sts. Peter and Paul in Mexico City. During the Reform War the same year the Corps of Cadets was involved in a clash with the forces of Gen. Miguel Blanco on October 15 in Toluca. Casualties suffered by the cadets and instructors in this and subsequent actions caused the closure of the college in 1861.

The college was reopened in 1867. Located first in the National Palace the college was moved to various locations before returning to the Chapultepec Castle in 1882. Formerly a joint services institution, the college became an academy for the Mexican Army only in 1897, following the establishment of the Military Naval School in Veracruz.

On 8 February 1913 the 600 cadets of the Military College played a part in the coup known as The Ten Tragic Days against President Francisco Madero. Cadets of the separate Escuela Militar de Aspirantes de Tlalpan (established in 1905 as an additional academy for training junior officers) had joined with regular army units in an ultimately successful attempt to overthrow Madero. However a detachment of cadets from the Heroic Military College, acting on the orders of Deputy Commandant Lieutenant Colonel Víctor Hernández Covarrubias escorted President Madero from Chapultepec Castle to the National Palace on the following day. Termed the Loyalty March, this action is still marked by an annual parade by the Corps of Cadets, attended by the present-day President of Mexico and his Cabinet.

The new government down-graded the role of the Heroic Military College, briefly merging its functions with those of the Escuela Militar de Aspirantes de Tlalpan and accelerating the training of cadets from both academies to reinforce the crumbling Federal Army. Following the overthrow of General Victoriano Huerta in July 1914 and the disbandment of the Federal Army, the college was closed. It was reestablished in February 1920 albeit in a new campus in Popotla, Mexico City. Later that spring the then reestablished cavalry squadron were involved in what has been termed "the final cavalry charge in the Americas". This occurred on May 8, when on the orders of Colonel Rodolfo Casillas the cadets acted in support of regular army dragoons led by General Pilar Sanchez under attack by rebel forces in Apizaco, Tlaxcala. In another engagement two days later a cadet was killed in action in San Marcos while supporting government forces.

== The college from 1947 to today ==
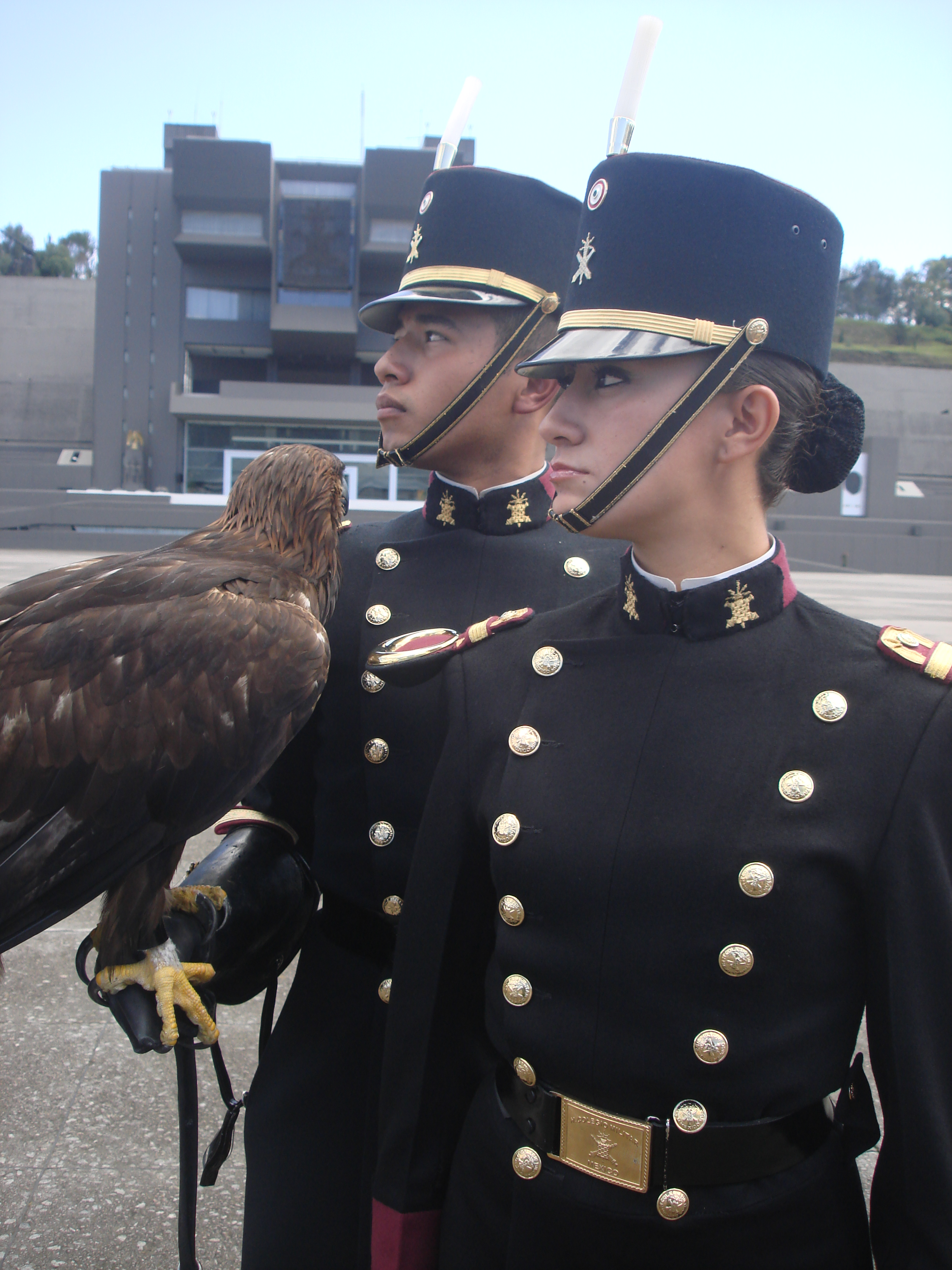
A cadet holding the golden eagle mascot. A female cadet stands in the foreground. Both wear the gala uniform of the Cadet Corps

In 1947 The Military College celebrated the centenary of the Corps of Cadets' participation in the Battle of Chapultepec, the finest hour of its history. In 1949, the Congress of the Union formally conferred the "Heroic" designation to both the Corps and to the Midshipmen's Battalion of the Naval Military Academy, the latter for its role in resisting the United States occupation of Veracruz in 1914.

To celebrate the 150th anniversary of the Heroic Military College (1820–1970), 1 oz silver coins were minted by the Central Bank. In addition stamps featuring two Military College shakos were printed by the Government of Mexico. A special issue of stamps also commemorated the Golden Jubilee of "the final cavalry charge in the Americas"; carried out by the cavalry cadets of the college in 1920 (see above).

In 1976, the college's present campus in Tlalpan, Mexico City, was formally opened. It was partially damaged by the 1985 earthquake that struck the city. Today, the commandant of the academy is Brigade General Julio Álvarez Arellano.

The school was used as a setting for Luis Miguel's 1989 music video "La Incondicional". In the video he plays an Air Force cadet who is in love, but he must take his studies as soldier seriously. In a marching scene towards the end of the song one can see the "Por el Honor de Mexico" banner.

Perote, the second home of the Military College, has been dubbed by the Veracruz State Congress as The Cradle of the Military College since 2002.

From 2007, the academy has accepted female cadets, first in support arms and later in the combat services and combat arms. The present Corps is regiment-sized and has among its units a cavalry squadron and an artillery battery, plus an armored cavalry training squadron raised recently - a first in a military academy in Latin America.

The celebrations of the Academy Biccentennial were marked beginning in 2021 given the COVID-19 pandemic in Mexico and will officially conclude in 2023.

In 2020, the Academy officially welcomed the first officer cadets of the National Guard studying for a officer's commission in that force.

== Motto and collegiate slogan ==
Por el Honor de Mexico (For Mexico's Honor) is the college motto, made in a contest organized by radio station XEQ in commemoration of the centenary of the defense of Chalpultepec Castle in 1947.

Every midday, after the afternoon ceremony and before the midday parade, the following cheer is done by the Corps of Cadets:

- Cadet Corps Commander: "Heroico Colegio Militar" ("Heroic Military College")
- Cadets: Por el Honor de Mexico! (For Mexico's Honor!)

== Collegiate hymn and march ==
=== Hymn of the Heroic Military College ===
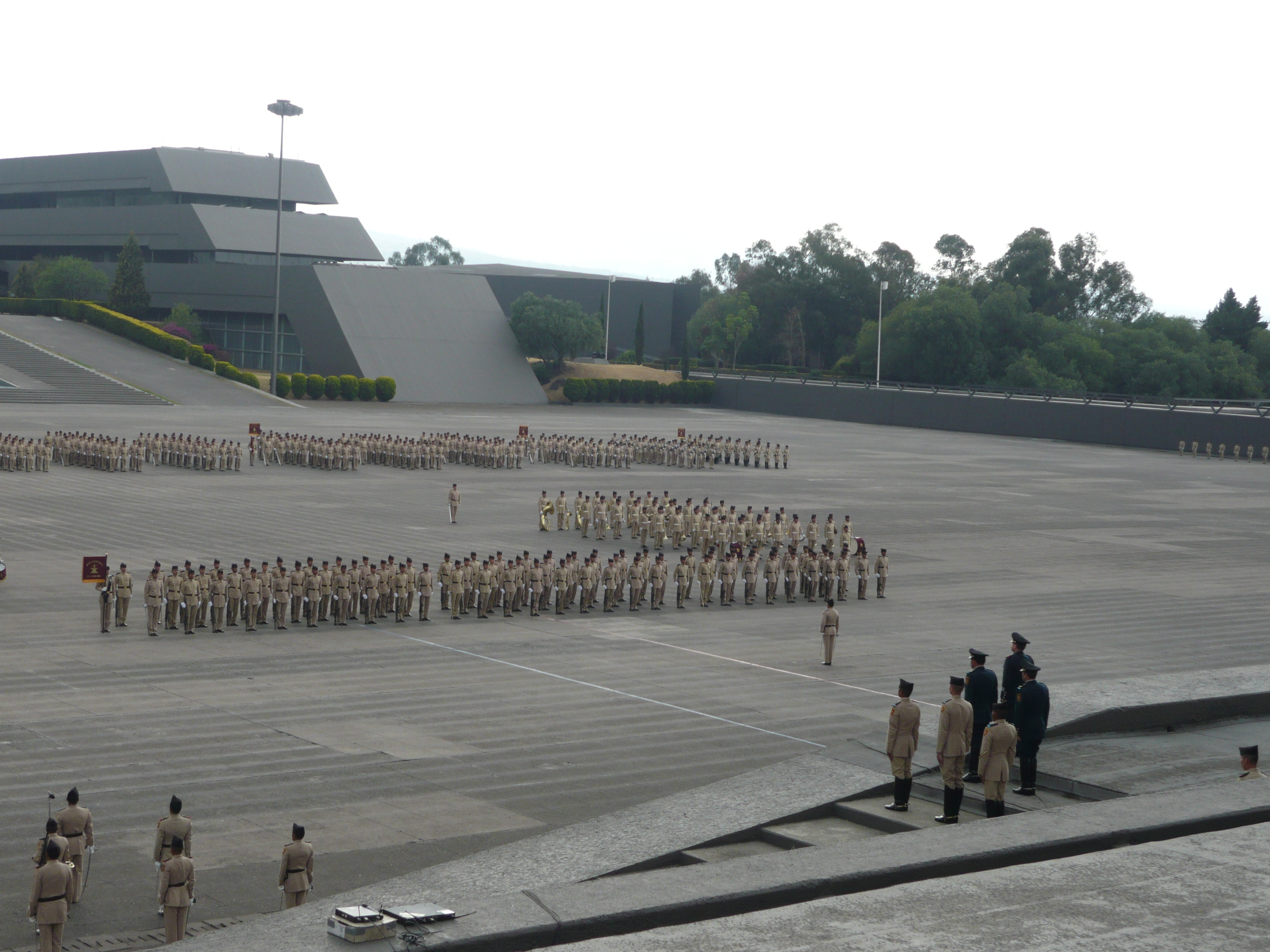
A military parade part of a ceremony on Heroico Colegio Militar at Tlalpan, Mexico City.

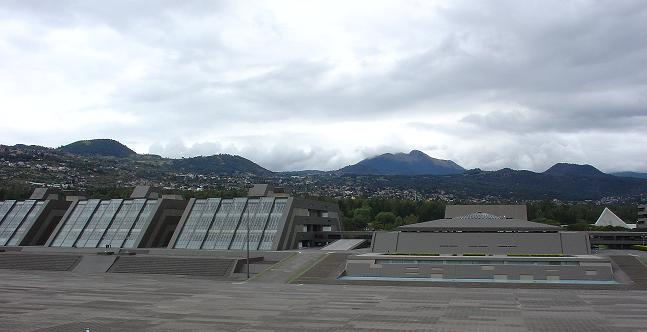
Military College

The Hymn of the Heroic Military College was composed in 1930 by Prof. José Ignacio Ríos del Río.

=== Lyrics ===
Chorus
Vibre el clarín de la guerra, resuenen las fanfarrias
Redoblen los tambores, una marcha triunfal
Y lleven de la Patria a todos los confines
Tu nombre sacrosanto,
Colegio Militar
Tu nombre sacrosanto,
Colegio Militar

Verse
Colegio sacrosanto, de memoria bendita
de forjaran sus almas, Montes de Oca y Melgar
La Patria bate marcha de honor a tu pasado,
de epopeyas gloriosas y de nombre inmortal.

Y en un gesto sublime de amor y de cariño,
bendice a los efebos que supieron morir
bañados por las ráfagas de luz espendorosa
que el ángel de la gloria enviara del cenit.

Repeat chorus

=== Regimental march of the Heroic Military College ===
The Regimental march was composed by Lieutenant José Sotero Ortiz Sánchez, in time for the college's 1947 centenary of the Battle of Chapultepec.

=== Lyrics ===
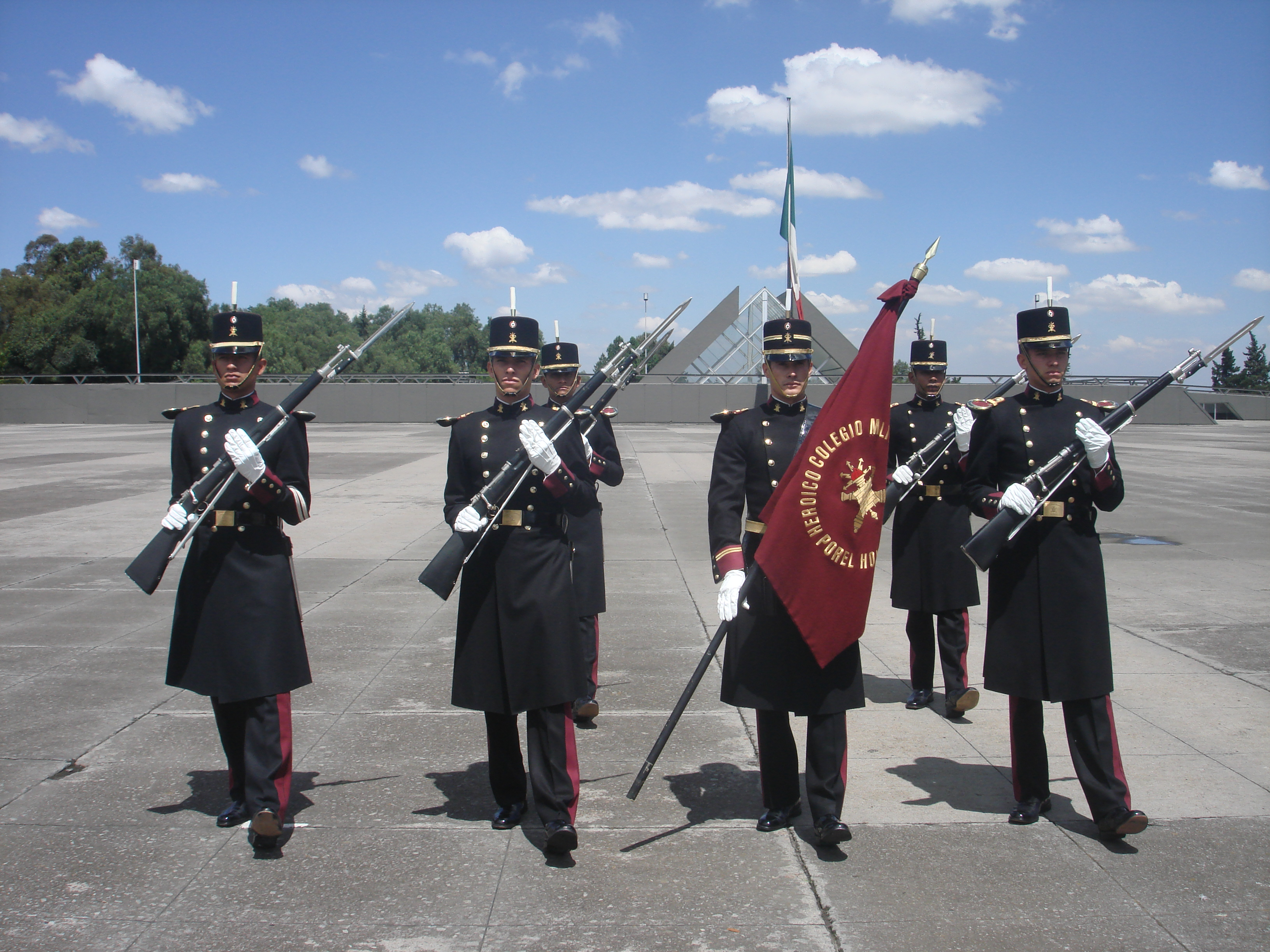

Páginas del libro de la historia del Heroico Colegio Militar
de epopeyas que ya jamás se borran del santuario de la inmortalidad.
Canto que se eleva a la memoria como ofrenda de honor a la lealtad
de los héroes que envueltos por la gloria grandioso ejemplo que nos dio la libertad.
Repeat all

Juventud de mi patria sublime, que marcháis con gallarda ilusión
aumentáreis la historia que escribe nobles hechos de sangre y honor.
Yunque forjador de hombres de guerra como Suárez, Escutia y Melgar,
Montes de Oca, Márquez y De la Barrera, los niños héroes de mi México inmortal
Repeat all

== Commandants ==
No.	Period	Rank		Notes
1	1818–1823	Brigadier General	Diego García Conde	
2	1823–1824	Cavalry Colonel	Juan Domínguez y Gálvez	
3	1825–1828	Cavalry Lieutenant Colonel	José Manuel Arechaga	
4	1835–1836	Engineers Colonel	Ignacio Mora y Villamil	
5	1836–1846	Brigadier General	Pedro García Conde	
6	1846–1847	Graduate Captain, Commander	Francisco García Salinas	Only naval officer commandant of the college
7	1847–1853	Graduate Gen., Engineers Colonel	José Mariano Monterde Segura	Led the defense of Chapultepec Castle during the Battle of Chapultepec which took a heavy toll for the Academy
8	1853–1854	Graduate Gen., Engineers Colonel	Santiago Blanco Duque de Estrada	
9	1854–1859	Graduate Gen., Engineers Colonel	Luis Tola Algarín	
10	1859–1860	Engineers Colonel (Staff)	José Mariano Monterde Segura	2nd Period
11	1861–1863	Brigade General	José Justo Alvarez Valenzuela	
12	1868–1871	Engineers Colonel	Amado Camacho	
13	1871–1880	Engineers Colonel	Miguel Quintana González	
14	1880–1883	Divisional General	Sóstenes Rocha	
15	1883–1884	General Graduado, Coronel Tec. de Artillería	Francisco de Paula Méndez	
16	1884–1906	Engineers Colonel General	Juan Villegas	Highest-ranking officer commandant of the college
17	1906–1912	General de Brigada de E.M. Esp.	Joaquín Beltrán Castañares	
18	1912–1913	Brigade General	Felipe Ángeles	
19	1913	Artillery Technical Colonel	Miguel Bernard	
20	1914	Division General	Samuel García Cuéllar	
Closed in 1914 during Mexican Revolution, reopened 1920
21	1920	Brigade General	Angel Vallejo	
22	1920	Brigade General	Joaquín Mucel Acereto	
23	1920–1921	General de Brigada	Marcelino Murrieta Murrieta	
24	1921–1923	General de Brigada	Víctor Hernández Covarrubias	
25	1923	General de Brigada	José Domingo Ramírez Garrido	
26	1923–1925	General de Brigada	Miguel Angel Peralta	
27	1925	General de Brigada I.C.	Manuel Mendoza Sarabia	
28	1925	Brigadier General	Amado Aguirre Santiago	
29	1925–1927	Division general	Miguel M. Acosta Guajardo	
30	1927–1928	General de Brigada	Juan José Ríos	
31	1928–1931	General de División	Gilberto R. Limón	
32	1931–1935	General de División	Joaquín Amaro Domínguez	
33	1935–1936	General de Brigada	Rafael Cházaro Pérez	
34	1936	General de Brigada	Samuel Carlos Rojas Raso	
35	1936–1938	General de Brigada	Othón León Lobato	
36	1939–1941	General de Brigada	Alberto Zuno Hernández	
37	1941–1942	General de División	Marcelino García Barragán	
38	1942–1945	General de División	Gilberto R. Limón	2nd Period
39	1945–1948	General de Brigada	Luis Alamillo Flores	
40	1948–1950	General de Brigada	Rafael Ávila Camacho	
41	1950–1953	General de División	Tomás Sánchez Hernández	
42	1953–1955	General de División	Leobardo Ruiz Camarillo	
43	1955–1959	General de División	Francisco de Jesús Grajales Godoy	
44	1959–1965	General de Brigada	Jerónimo Gomar Suástegui	
45	1965–1970	General de Brigada	Roberto Yáñez Vázquez	
46	1971–1973	General de Brigada	Miguel Rivera Becerra	
47	1976	General de División	Salvador Revueltas Olvera	
48	1976–1980	General de División	Absalón Castellanos Domínguez	
49	1980–1982	General de División	Enrique Cervantes Aguirre	
50	1983–1985	General de Brigada	Jaime Contreras Guerrero	
51	1985–1988	General de División	Carlos Cisneros Montes de Oca	
52	1988–1991	General de División	Carlos Duarte Sacramento	
53	1991–1994	General de Brigada	Luis Ángel Fuentes Álvarez	
54	1994–1997	General de Brigada	Rigoberto Castillejos Adriano	
55	1997–2000	General de Brigada	Salvador Cienfuegos Zepeda	
56	2000–2002	Divisional General	Tomás Ángeles Dauahare	
57	2002–2003	General de Brigada	Manuel Sánchez Aguilar	
58	2003–2006	Brigade General	Carlos García Priani	
59	2007–2008	Brigade General	Francisco Tomas Gonzalez Loaiza	
60	2008–2011	Brigade General	Gonzalo Bernardino Duran Valdez	
61	2011–2013	Brigade General	Sergio Alberto Martinez Castuera	
62	2013–2017	Brigade General	André Georges Foullon Van Lissum	
63	2017–2020	Brigade General	Julio Álvarez Arellano	
64	2020–	Brigade General	Fidel Mondragón Rivero	

== In popular culture ==
The site was used as a location for the 1990 movie Total Recall. The buildings of the academy were used as apartments and a subway entrance.

== See also ==
- Military history of Mexico
