= 1929 Mexican presidential election =

- 17 November 1929
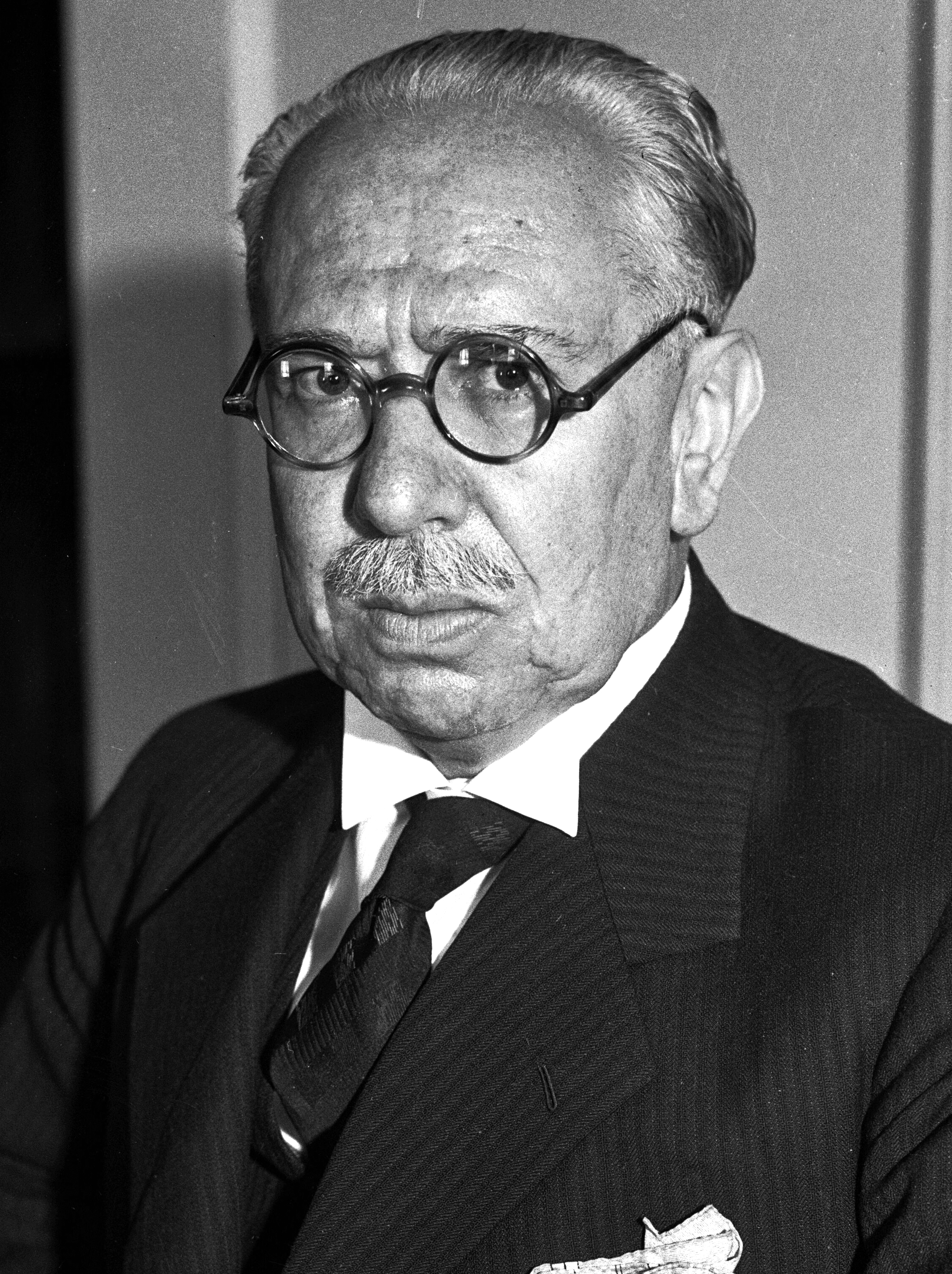

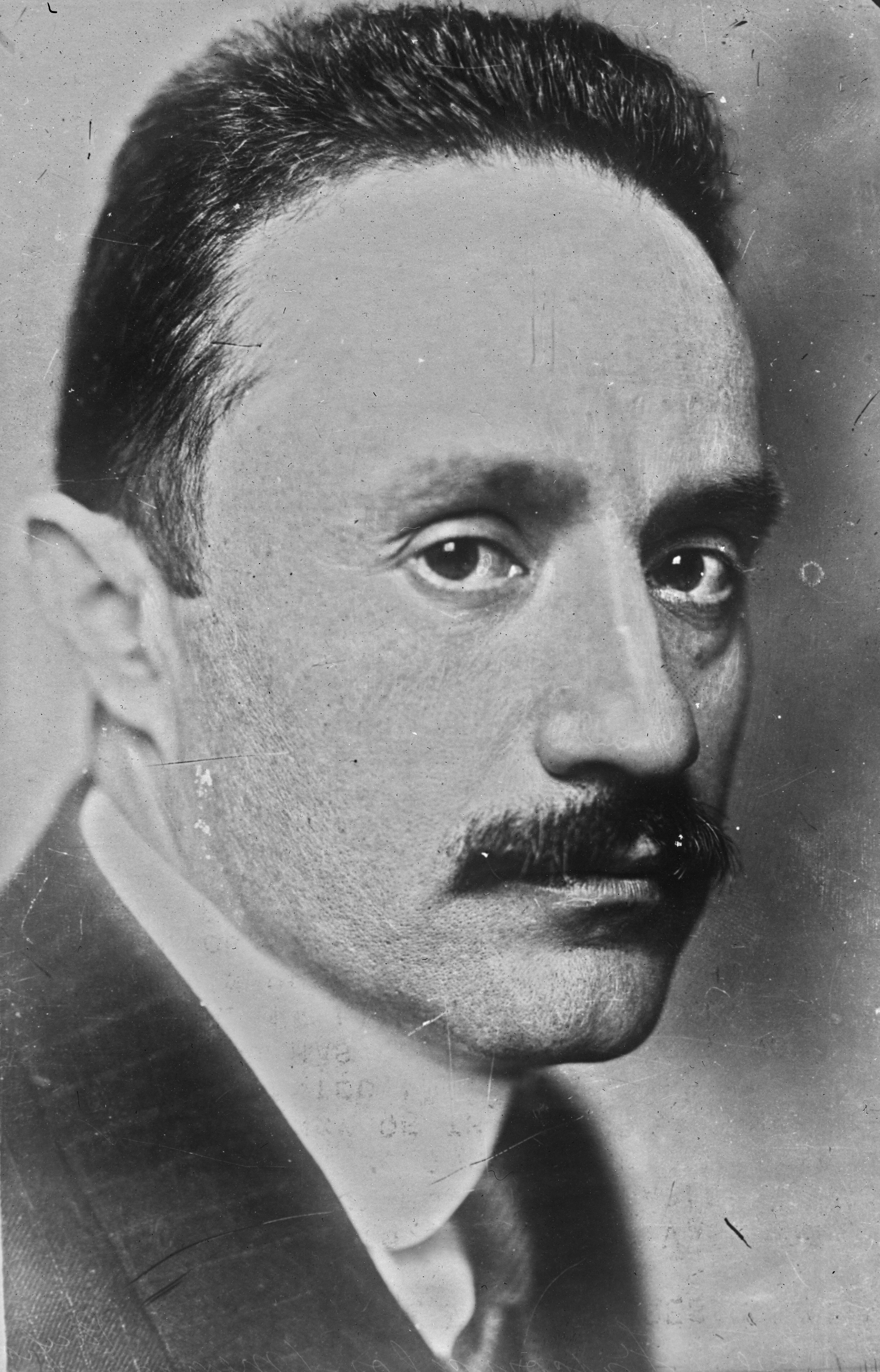
Nominee	Pascual Ortiz Rubio	José Vasconcelos
Party	PNR	PNA
Popular vote	1,947,848	110,979
Percentage	93.55%	5.33%
President before election
Emilio Portes Gil
PNR
Elected President
Pascual Ortiz Rubio
PNR

Presidential elections were held in Mexico on 17 November 1929. The winner of these elections was to serve the remainder of the 1928–1934 term for which Álvaro Obregón had been elected to the previous year before his assassination.

The National Revolutionary Party (PNR), founded in 1928 by Mexico's most powerful leader at the time, Plutarco Elías Calles, made its debut in these elections. The 1929 elections marked the beginning of 71 uninterrupted years of rule by that party, which was later renamed Party of the Mexican Revolution (PRM) in 1938 and finally, Institutional Revolutionary Party (PRI) in 1946. No opposition party would win a presidential election until the 2000 elections.

According to the official results, the elections were won by Pascual Ortiz Rubio, who received 93.6% of the vote. Opposition candidate José Vasconcelos claimed that the elections had been fraudulent and unsuccessfully tried to organize an armed revolt to take power.

Ortiz Rubio was not able to serve the remainder of Álvaro Obregón's term as he was supposed to, as he resigned in September 1932 due to differences with Calles. Abelardo L. Rodríguez served the remaining two years of the term.

== Background ==
=== Obregón and Calles presidencies ===
A generation of caudillos, authoritarian military leaders with popular support, came to dominate Mexican politics as a result of the Mexican Revolution (1910–1920). In 1920, Generals Álvaro Obregón, Adolfo de la Huerta, and Plutarco Elías Calles launched the Plan of Agua Prieta, which successfully ousted President Venustiano Carranza after the latter attempted to impose Ignacio Bonillas as his successor in the 1920 presidential election. Following Carranza's ouster, de la Huerta became interim president, and held the planned 1920 elections, which Obregón won. His candidacy was supported by the Laborist Party (PL) of the Regional Confederation of Mexican Workers (CROM) and its leader Luis N. Morones.

Obregón became president on 1 December of that year, being considered Mexico's last caudillo. Calles served as his secretary of the interior, while de la Huerta was his secretary of finance. In 1923, Obregón supported Calles to succeed him as president. Calles also received the support of the PL. De la Huerta felt that Obregón was imitating Carranza by imposing a successor, and so that same year he launched the Delahuertista Rebellion. By early 1924, the rebellion had been suppressed. Calles won the 1924 presidential election.

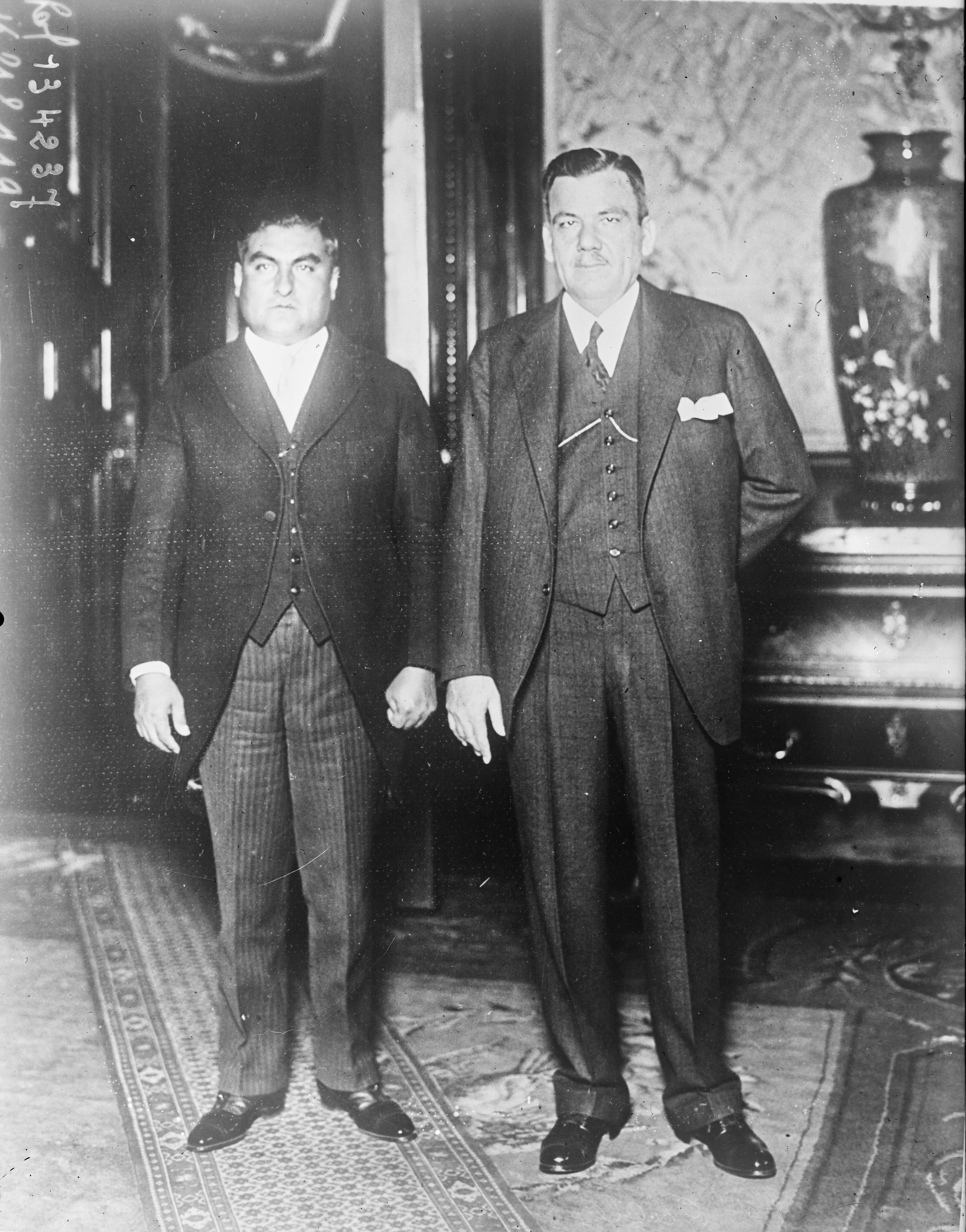
Emilio Portes Gil and Plutarco Elías Calles in 1928

During Calles' presidency, his anti-clerical policies led to the three-year Cristero War between the government and Catholic militants, known as Cristeros. In 1927, the Constitution of Mexico was amended to allow for nonconsecutive presidential reelection and extended terms from four to six years. Obregón subsequently launched a campaign to be reelected to the presidency, which was supported by Calles. In the 1928 election, held on 1 July, Obregón was reelected unopposed.

=== Obregón assassination and aftermath ===
On 17 July 1928, President-Elect Obregón was assassinated by the Catholic militant José de León Toral. An interim president would soon have to be inaugurated and serve until another election could be called. Calles held a meeting with thirty of the country's most prominent generals to get their support for the interim president being a civilian. For the position, Calles supported Emilio Portes Gil, his secretary of the interior. Portes Gil was designated on 28 September by the Congress of the Union to succeed Calles. He assumed office on 1 December. During his brief presidency, Portes Gil ended the Cristero War and held a new presidential election.

Following Obregón's assassination, Calles continued to exercise power and remained the most important political figure in the country. Calles' rule is sometimes known as the Maximato, deriving from his title of "Maximum Leader of the Mexican Revolution" (Spanish: Jefe Máximo de la Revolución Mexicana). Calles viewed the death of Obregón as an opportunity to reform Mexico's political system. In his final speech to Congress on 1 September 1928, he denounced caudillismo as preventing Mexico's development, and that with the death Obregón Mexico should become a nation of institutions rather than caudillos. He also announced that he would not seek reelection.

== Parties and candidates ==
=== PNR and Ortiz Rubio ===
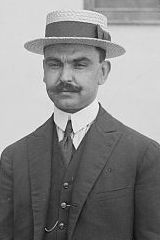
Aarón Sáenz Garza enjoyed the support of many figures in the PNR to become the party's candidate, but Calles ultimately decided on Pascual Ortiz Rubio.

Following the selection of Portes Gil as interim president, Calles began the process of forming a new political party, the National Revolutionary Party (Spanish: Partido Nacional Revolucionario, PNR). He at first served as president of the PNR's Organizing Committee, though he shortly thereafter resigned to hold unofficial leadership. The same day Portes Gil took office, the Organizing Committee published its first manifesto. On 20 January 1929, the party published their first program.

Since late 1928, various figures within the revolutionary regime had supported the pre-candidacy of Aarón Sáenz Garza, who had held important positions during the presidencies of Obregón and Calles, and who had also been a key player in the negotiations to end the Cristero War. One of his most important supporters was the controversial anti-Catholic former Governor of Tabasco and Yucatán, Tomás Garrido Canabal.

However, Sáenz did not have the support of Calles, who instead decided to back Pascual Ortiz Rubio. Ortiz Rubio came from an aristocratic family in Michoacán, and was an engineer by profession. He participated in the Mexican Revolution, and became the governor of his home state, ultimately supporting the Plan of Agua Prieta. During the presidencies of Obregón and Calles, he served as Mexico's ambassador to Germany and Brazil. On 26 December 1928, he returned to Mexico from Brazil on Calles' orders. He was reportedly going to be named Portes Gil's secretary of the interior, but he did not assume the office. Mexican historian Enrique Krauze wrote that Ortiz Rubio had an "impeccable record", but as he had been out of the country for several years, he had no personal political base.

Another figure considered by contemporary media for the PNR’s presidential nomination was the Governor of Baja California, Abelardo L. Rodríguez; however, on 14 November 1928, he “disqualified” himself from participating in the race, claiming he lacked “the necessary preparation to assume leadership of the country, which has many and very delicate problems to resolve” and stating, “I have not sought nor do I seek” the presidency. Ironically, just under four years later, Rodríguez would assume the presidency following Ortiz Rubio’s resignation.

The PNR held its first national convention from 1 to 4 March 1929 in the city of Querétaro, wherein they would pick their presidential candidate. Sáenz Garza accused the leadership of the nascent PNR of being biased in favor of Ortiz Rubio’s pre-candidacy, as well as of having replaced most of the delegations that were to attend the national convention. It was also rumored that Calles had waged a smear campaign against Sáenz Garza because the latter was a Presbyterian. For these reasons, Sáenz Garza announced on the first day of the convention that he and the delegations supporting him would withdraw from it. On March 4, the convention proceeded with the election of the PNR’s presidential candidate; although the party’s bylaws stipulated that the presidential candidate must be elected by secret ballot of the convention delegates, numerous shouts in favor of Ortiz Rubio were heard when the assembly began the registration of candidates, and a speaker proposed that the nomination be decided by acclamation, which was accepted by the convention chairman, Filiberto Gómez. Ortiz Rubio was then elected as the candidate by acclamation without a vote by the delegates. That same day, the party was legally declared to exist.

=== PNA and Vasconcelos ===
José Vasconcelos hailed from a middle-class family from Oaxaca. He became a prominent philosopher and politician, participating in the Mexican Revolution. Post-revolution, he served as the rector of the National Autonomous University of Mexico from 1920 to 1921, and then as secretary of public education under Obregón from 1921 to 1924. In the latter post, he oversaw, among other projects, a widespread campaign to combat illiteracy and sponsored the Mexican muralist movement. He sought to become the governor of Oaxaca in 1923, but Obregón refused to support him, and he ultimately resigned. Becoming an opposition politician, he spent several years lecturing abroad. He returned to Mexico upon Calles' promise of free elections for 1929. He subsequently launched an independent presidential campaign.

In 1927, the National Anti-Reelectionist Party (Spanish: Partido Nacional Antireeleccionista, PNA) declared Gen. Arnulfo R. Gómez to be their candidate for the 1928 elections. However, later that year, he and Gen. Francisco R. Serrano conspired to overthrow and imprison Obregón and Calles, but their effort failed and they were executed. On 12 June 1929, PNA registered José Vasconcelos as their candidate. On 5 July, Vasconcelos was officially elected the PNA's candidate. The PNA's endorsement of Vasconcelos came late, as he was already several months into his campaign.

=== PCM and Rodríguez Triana ===
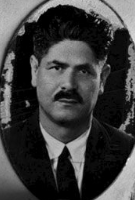
PCM candidate Rodríguez Triana

In late 1928 or early 1929, the Mexican Communist Party (Spanish: Partido Comunista Mexicano, PCM) founded the United Bloc of Workers and Peasants (Spanish: Bloque Unido de Obreros y Campesinos, BUOC), (Note: Referred to as the Bloque Nacional Obrero y Campesino by Barry Carr) a coalition including the PCM's National Peasant League and various Magonist groups. On 25 January 1929, the group named Gen. Pedro Rodríguez Triana as their presidential candidate. In his acceptance speech, Rodríguez Triana stated that he expected to lose the election. Rodríguez Triana was the first of only five presidential candidates that the PCM presented in its existence until its dissolution in the 1980s.

== Campaign ==
=== Campaign launches and Escobar Rebellion ===
Vasconcelos began his campaign in Nogales, Sonora in January 1929, and from there he continued through the northeast to the center of the country. He also toured the United States to win the support of migrants. To prevent migrants from voting, the government closed the border with the United States during the election. Vasconcelos' supporters were primarily college students, from urban areas, and members of the middle class. Krauze described Vasconcelos' campaign as "one of the most impressive and broadly inclusive democratic campaigns in the history of Mexico". However, his campaign was also criticized for focusing too much on urban centers instead of the rural areas (where 66.5% of Mexico's population lived at the time).

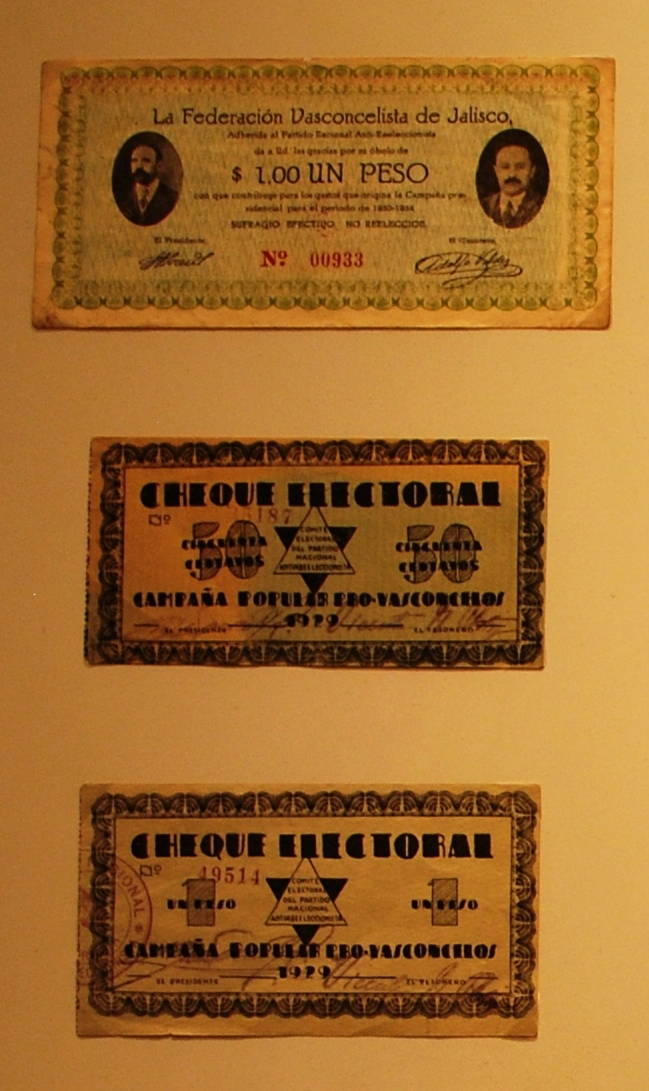
Contribution bonds for the Vasconcelos campaign

On 3 March, a group of generals led by José Gonzalo Escobar launched a rebellion against Portes Gil's government and denounced Ortiz Rubio's candidacy. By April the government had successfully put down the rebellion. In contrast to Vasconcelos, Ortiz Rubio waited until the Escobar Rebellion was put down to begin touring the country. Ortiz Rubio began his campaign on 10 May 1929 with a banquet in Xochimilco. He began his tour of the country in Hidalgo on 26 May. There, he claimed to have the support of "genuine popular elements", and described the PNR as a symbol of force, energy, peace, and harmony. He also said that the campaign would not be violent, and said that his opponents would see that the election was:

... the most diaphanous demonstration that we are in perfect conditions to contend in civic struggles, in the same way that the most advanced peoples of the Earth do.

Gilberto Valenzuela, Ambassador to the United Kingdom, returned to Mexico in late 1928 and expressed his interest in running in the 1929 presidential election. Having broken up with Calles for good, he began a campaign tour of the northwestern part of the country in early 1929. He later supported the ill-fated Escobarista Rebellion; following the rebels' defeat, Valenzuela called off his campaign and went into exile in the United States.

=== Platforms ===
In July 1929 Calles left Mexico for Europe for nearly five months, announcing that "the future of Mexico is guranteed". Simultaneously, Portes Gil negotiated an end to the Cristero War as the Cristeros were considering supporting Vasconcelos. Vasconcelos himself expressed frustration at the Cristeros' surrender, as he had been counting on their support for an eventual rebellion after the election (which he later implied to have already planned beforehand). (Note: (Translated from Spanish) The news of the Cristeros’ forced surrender sent a chill down my spine. I saw in it the hand of Morrow, who was thus depriving us of any base for the rebellion that a rejection of the election results would logically entail.)

During his campaign, Vasconcelos argued that the military was too large for the country's needs, and called for a sharp reduction in military spending. Vasconcelos distributed copies of the Iliad to supporters, which the PNR's newspaper, El Nacional Revolucionario, criticized, stating "a country cannot be governed with literary teachings... the PNR does not distribute The Iliad... but rather 35 million hectares", referring to Obregón and Calles' policies of land redistribution.

The PNR's first declaration of principles declared that they would "help and stimulate gradually the Mexican woman's access to the activities of civic life" but did not promise equality of political rights. By contrast, the PNA endorsed women's suffrage and according to Mexican historian Gabriela Cano Ortega, a high percentage of their supporters were women. Rodríguez Triana's platform called for the creation of workers and peasants' soviets, a replacement of the judiciary with "people's courts", arming peasants, establishing a minimum wage, putting a cap on salaries for public officials, and worker control of land and factories.

== Results ==
The election was held on 17 November 1929. Results were announced on 28 November.

Candidate	Party	Votes	%
Pascual Ortiz Rubio	National Revolutionary Party	1,947,848	93.55
José Vasconcelos	National Anti-Reelectionist Party	110,979	5.33
Pedro Rodríguez Triana	Mexican Communist Party	23,279	1.12
Total		2,082,106	100.00
Source: Nohlen, Ramírez Rancaño, Museo del Objeto

=== Results by state ===
State	Ortiz Rubio	Vasconcelos	Triana
Aguascalientes	16,558	1,051	0
Baja California	10,869	998	0
Campeche	12,027	431	305
Chiapas	59,170	247	0
Chihuahua	52,582	10,450	3,616
Coahuila	58,859	11,689	2,684
Colima	10,532	437	0
Distrito Federal	117,149	1,517	2,124
Durango	30,222	5,663	45
Guanajuato	144,509	13,219	0
Guerrero	40,855	216	0
Hidalgo	120,735	152	4,943
Jalisco	121,859	7,914	0
Mexico	131,117	0	0
Michoacán	137,025	11,457	379
Morelos	14,224	585	1,520
Nayarit	26,605	0	0
Nuevo León	36,114	587	1,114
Oaxaca	138,319	394	0
Puebla	90,019	1,847	0
Querétaro	16,913	819	0
Quintana Roo	1,300	120	0
San Luis Potosí	90,012	315	0
Sinaloa	33,211	10,522	0
Sonora	20,142	8,400	715
Tabasco	18,049	230	1,114
Tamaulipas	58,813	3,247	0
Tlaxcala	24,627	524	0
Veracruz	144,243	13,948	3,400
Yucatán	91,077	0	0
Zacatecas	80,112	4,000	1,320
Total	1,947,848	110,979	23,279
Source: Ramírez Rancaño

== Aftermath ==
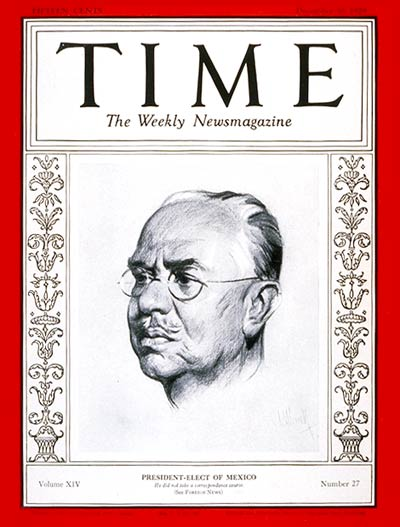
President-elect Ortiz Rubio on the cover of Time magazine, 30 December 1929

=== Electoral fraud accusations ===
The opposition candidate José Vasconcelos refused to recognize the official results, claiming that a massive electoral fraud had taken place, and proclaimed his "Plan de Guaymas", urging the Mexican people to rebel against the alleged fraud. His call to rebellion went unheeded; he was subsequently jailed, and after being released he moved to the United States.

Several modern authors, such as Enrique Krauze, have arrived at the conclusion that the 1929 elections were indeed rigged and Ortiz Rubio probably lost the election. In subsequent decades, the National Revolutionary Party, later renamed Institutional Revolutionary Party, continued resorting to electoral fraud to perpetuate itself in power. Historian Verónica Oikión Solano described the election as, contratry to Ortiz Rubio's claim, "[not] diaphanous, in any sense".

=== Subsequent political developments ===
Ortiz Rubio became president on 5 February 1930. Calles served as his Secretary of war and the navy from 1931 to 1932. Ortiz Rubio was the victim of an assassination attempt on the day of his inauguration, which left him greatly disturbed for the remainder of his presidency. Although he was supposed to have been president until 1 December 1934, he resigned on 2 September 1932 in protest over Calles' excessive interference on his government.
