= Bombing of Naco =

1929 international incident during Escobar Rebellion

- Part of Escobar Rebellion
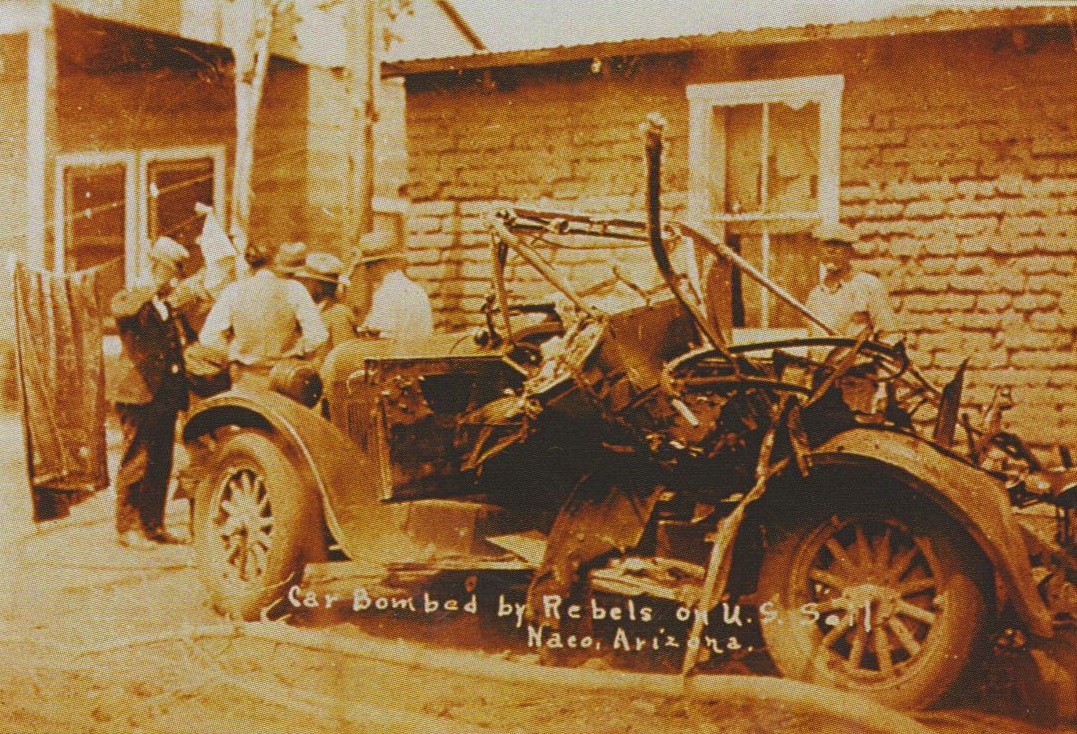
- A Dodge touring car destroyed by Patrick Murphy in the bombing of Naco.
- Date: April 2, 1929–April 6, 1929
- Location: Naco, Cochise County, Arizona, United States
- Also known as: The Naco incident
- Type: Aerial bombardment
- Participants: Patrick Murphy

The Bombing of Naco was an international incident which occurred in the border town of Naco, Arizona, during the 1929 Escobar Rebellion. While rebel forces were battling Mexican 'Federales' for control of the neighboring town of Naco, Sonora, the Irish-American mercenary and pilot Patrick Murphy was hired to bombard the government forces with improvised explosives dropped from his biplane. During the ensuing fighting, Murphy mistakenly dropped bombs on the American side of the international border on three occasions, causing significant damage to both private and government-owned property, as well as slight injuries to several American spectators watching the battle from across the border. The bombing, although unintentional, is noted for being the first aerial bombardment of the continental United States by a foreign power in history.

== Background ==
Late in 1928, as the Cristero War was raging in western Mexico, a new revolutionary faction led by General José Gonzalo Escobar drafted the "Plan of Hermosillo" and occupied the copper mining town of Cananea, Sonora, not far from the international border with the United States. Encouraged by their successes early on, they next decided to take control of Agua Prieta and Naco, both situated on the border with Arizona, knowing many of the locals were sympathetic to their cause and thinking the revenue generated by these two towns would be a good source of income for the revolution. From there, General Escobar intended to carry the war south and ultimately oust Emilio Portes Gil and take his place as president.

The battle for Naco began early the next year, on the night of March 31, 1929. The rebels later claimed that they waited until 8:00 PM to attack, so as not to harm any American citizens shopping on the Mexican side of the border. To start the attack, the rebels loaded a train car full of explosives and sent it down the tracks toward the center of town. Unfortunately for the rebels, their plan failed when the train car derailed and exploded before reaching its intended target. After their failure with the train car, the rebels sought outside help from the United States and found it in an Irish-American cropduster named Patrick Murphy. Other pilots were hired as well, and the Federales found a pilot of their own named Jon Gorre. According to a witness, Murphy and Gorre were friends and although hired by opposing sides, would take turns making bombing runs on the opposing forces in Naco, Sonora, and would spend the night drinking together and enjoying themselves.

An Arizona citizen named Charlie Elledge saw much of the fighting in Naco, Sonora, while working to repair the roof of the immigration building along the border. Elledge says that Murphy and Gorre bought their homemade "suitcase bombs" from the same man and that about 200 people gathered on the American side of the border each day to watch the fighting, as they had during the Mexican Revolution a decade before. Some brought their children and picnic baskets with lunch and others climbed on top of train cars sitting idle along the border for a better view of the action. The men gambled with each other on where the bombs would fall.

=== Suitcase bomb ===
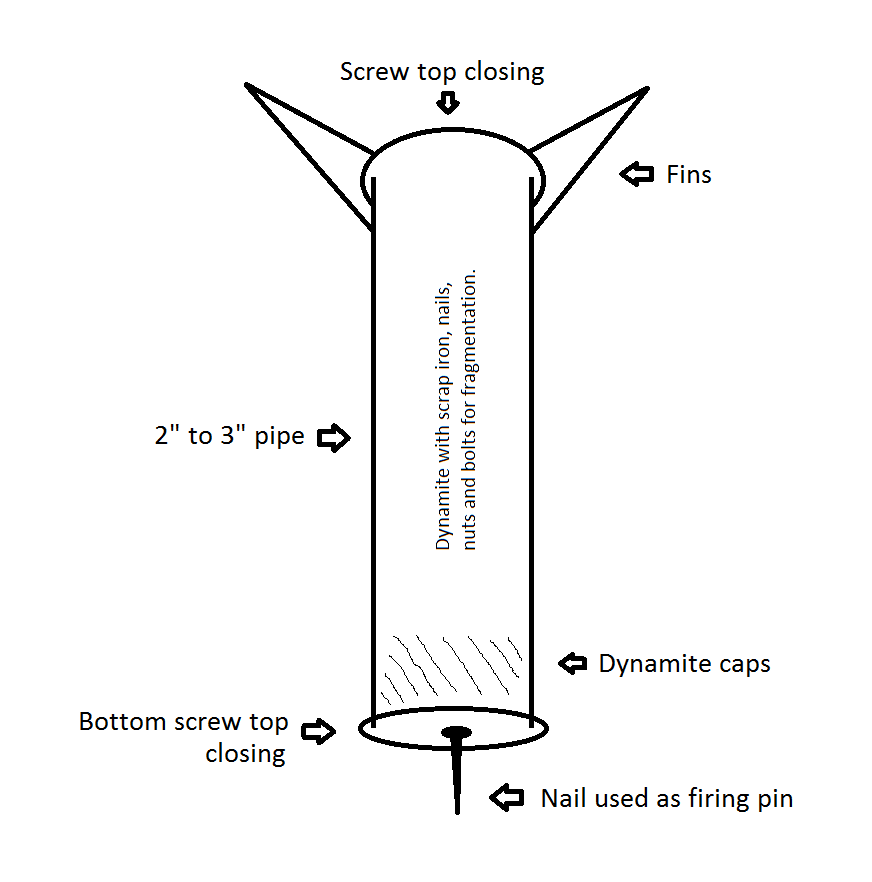
Diagram of the type of "suitcase bomb" dropped by Patrick Murphy and other pilots during the battle.

The so-called "suitcase bombs" used by Murphy and the other pilots in Naco were improvised aerial bombs made by packing dynamite, scrap iron, nails, nuts and bolts and other small pieces of material to use as fragmentation into a steel cylinder with fins and an improvised warhead made of dynamite caps and a nail for a firing pin. The bombs were then stuffed in suitcases that could be attached to the side of the plane and opened during flight to deliver the payload. Other improvised bombs were made the same way using five-gallon gasoline cans.

== Bombing ==
Murphy dropped one suitcase bomb each on his first two bombing runs, both of which turned out to be duds, and it was his third pass before managed to hit anything: the Mexican custom house near where the crowd of American spectators had formed. The resulting explosion sent small bits of shrapnel and other fragments into the crowd of spectators and caused the American patrons of the bars and clubs on the Mexican side of the border to rush back to their side of the line. Among those injured were a reporter and a photographer, along with many others, but nobody was killed and all of the injuries were considered minor. After realizing the danger of watching the battle from such a short distance away, the crowd dispersed and went home, some to Fry and Buena.

Neither Murphy or any of the other pilots were very successful in hitting their targets, but the high winds which regularly blow in the region in late spring and early summer most likely contributed to their inaccuracy. The first bomb to actually hit Arizona soil landed at 7:45 AM on April 2 and it was followed by others over the next few days. Murphy's bombing runs smashed windows and otherwise damaged several buildings on the American side of the border, including a garage, the Phelps-Dodge Mercantile and the Haas Pharmacy. One bomb also struck the post office building, making it a federal offense, and another landed next to one of the idle train cars used by the crowd of spectators. Other bombs left large craters in the dirt streets and other unpaved surfaces. Yet another bomb landed on and devastated a regal Dodge touring car owned by a Mexican Army officer, which had been left on the American side of the border for safekeeping during the expected hostilities.

Murphy's bombs were responsible for at least a few deaths on the Mexican side of the border, but nobody was killed on the American side. The Americans suffered more casualties over the following days as bombs landed on their side, but none of the injuries were life-threatening. The final bombardment took place on April 6, when the rebels launched their final attack to take control of the city. Murphy was shot down by Mexican soldiers the following day, but he managed to escape and get across the border, where he was quickly arrested by American authorities. He was released for unspecified reasons after only a couple nights in jail. After being repulsed in their final attack, the rebels retreated to Cananea by way of Agua Prieta, marking the beginning of the end of the revolution in the north.

== Aftermath ==
The United States Army was slow in responding to the situation, having closed all military posts in Arizona the same year, with the exception of Fort Huachuca. Fort Huachuca, which is relatively close to Naco, sent two companies of Buffalo Soldiers to occupy Naco, Arizona, and prevent the fighting from spreading into American territory. The commander of the detachment positioned his men along the border and had them prepare to attack at a moment's notice while he crossed the border and demanded that the rebel commanders stop dropping bombs on the Arizona side. By this time, however, the rebels were already defeated, and so the Buffalo Soldiers never had to engage. A squadron of eighteen warplanes was also dispatched from somewhere in Texas to shoot down any plane violating American airspace, but it never went into action either, and was withdrawn sometime later without incident.

Murphy never faced charges for his bombing of Naco, Arizona, which became the first aerial bombardment of the continental United States by a foreign power in American history. According to local rumor, the rebel commander, General Escobar, kept a plane loaded with gold near the border so he could escape if the revolution collapsed. When it did, Escobar flew into Arizona, where he asked for and received asylum from the local authorities. The rebellion officially came to an end not long after the incident in Naco.

== Popular culture ==
"The Bombing of Naco" is a folk song written by Dolan Ellis and is found on his album Tall Tales, Lost Trails & Heroes.

== See also ==
- Attacks on the United States
- Siege of Naco
- Tulsa race massacre
- Bombing of Dutch Harbor
- Lookout Air Raids
