= Fort Naco =

Former military camp in Cochise County, Arizona

- Camp Naco Historic District
- U.S. National Register of Historic Places
- A building of Fort Naco in 2008

- Location within Arizona Location within the United States
- Location: Junction of Willson Rd. & Newell St., Naco, Arizona
- Coordinates: 31°20′24″N 109°57′10″W
- NRHP reference No.: 12000853
- Added to NRHP: October 17, 2012

Fort Naco
- Naco, Arizona

Site information
- Type: Army post
- Controlled by: Arizona
- Condition: abandoned

Site history
- Built: 1917
- Built by: United States
- Materials: adobe, brick, wood
- Battles/wars: Mexican Revolution

Garrison information
- Occupants: United States Army; Arizona National Guard

Fort Naco, Camp Naco, or Fort Newell began as a camp in the Southwest United States, on the outskirts of Naco, Arizona as part of the Mexican Border Project. Over time adobe and wooden buildings were constructed to house the garrison along with other permanent structures.

== History ==
Fort Naco, others call it Camp Naco or Fort Newell, was one of the last forts built by the United States in continental territory and is the only remaining border fort out of several that were constructed during the Mexican Revolution. Soldiers were first stationed in Naco in November 1910 and remained in the community due to continued fighting across the border, including the Battle of Naco in 1913 and the later Siege of Naco in 1915 in Sonora. Subsequent to Pancho Villa’s attack on Columbus, New Mexico in 1916, Naco was a staging area for American troops protecting the border. Camp Naco was constructed in 1917 as part of the Mexican Border Project. It was the headquarters of the 1st Infantry Regiment of the Arizona National Guard.

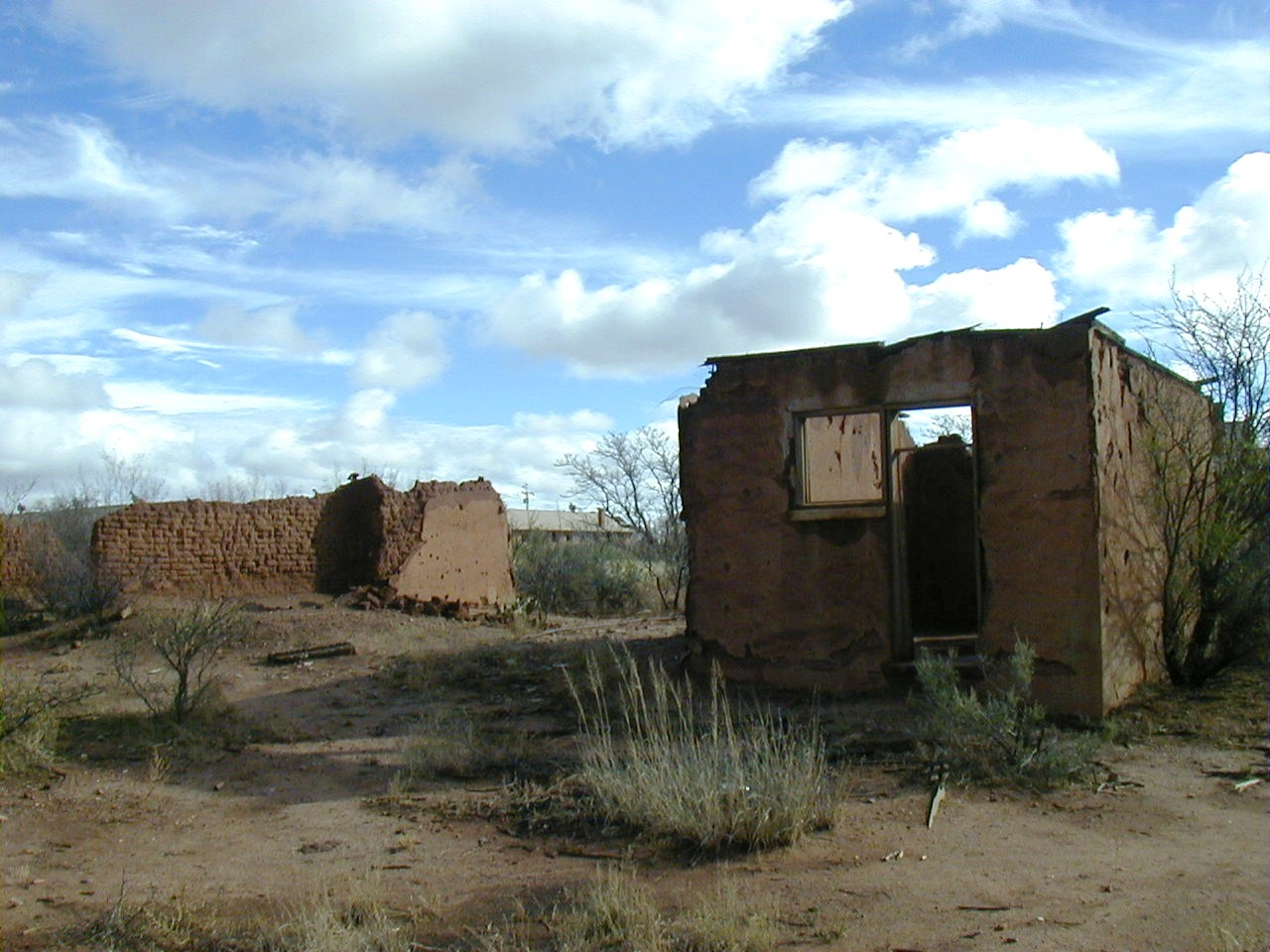
Ruins of Fort Naco.

Camp Naco was home to members of the U.S. Army 9th and 10th Cavalry and 25th Infantry. Fort Huachuca assigned African-American Buffalo Soldier units to its Naco Cantonment or outpost from 1911 to 1924. Their duties focused on patrolling the border and protecting U.S. citizens who came to Naco to watch Mexican Revolution battles raging across the line.

From 1935 to 1937, the Civilian Conservation Corps was based there.

In 1990, the youth services organization VisionQuest bought the property with a plan to open a juvenile treatment facility there. They were not able to do that, and in 2006, an arson fire and the discovery of hazardous asbestos on the site prompted the group to abandon the project. George Nerhan, then mayor of Huachuca City, agreed to take the site over rather than having it be destroyed.

As of 2010, the barracks of the fort still stands and has partially been restored.

In 2012, the site was added to the National Register of Historic Places.

In 2018, the site was acquired by the city of Bisbee.

More recently, grant funds have been used to clean up and preserve the site. The nonprofit group Friends of Camp Naco continues to look for a nonprofit organization or individual to take over the camp as a permanent project and adapt it for a future use. On May 4, 2022, Camp Naco was added to the 11 Most Endangered Historic Places of the National Trust for Historic Preservation.

In October 2022, the State of Arizona granted $4.6 million to the City of Bisbee for the purpose of reclaiming and restoring Camp Naco.
