= Gonzalo Escobar =

Gonzalo Escobar may refer to

- José Gonzalo Escobar (1892–1969), Mexican army officer
- Gonzalo Escobar (tennis) (born 1989), Ecuadorian tennis player
- Gonzalo Escobar (footballer) (born 1997), Argentine footballer
