= I-17 Mystery Christmas Tree =

Tree in Arizona

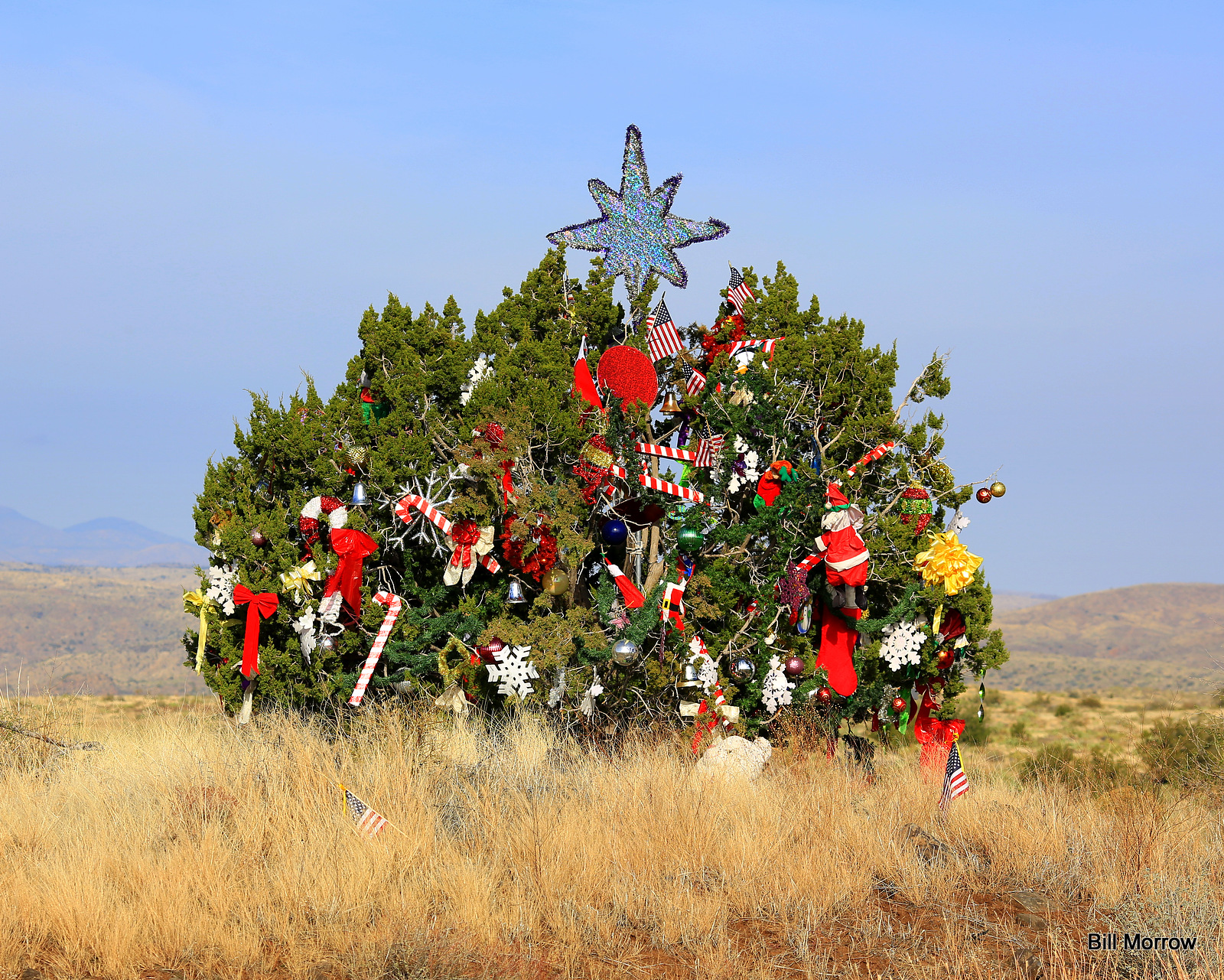
- The tree decorated in 2014
- Status: Active
- Genre: Christmas tree decoration
- Date: Late November – early January
- Frequency: Annually
- Location: I-17 in Yavapai County, Arizona
- Coordinates: 34.218132°N 112.111170°W
- Country: United States
- Years active: c. 1980–2019, 2025

The I-17 Mystery Christmas tree is a living tree in the median of Interstate 17 (I-17) in the US state of Arizona that was decorated each Christmas by people not publicly known. The tree is located near milepost 254, approximately 55 miles (89 km) north of downtown Phoenix, Arizona, between Sunset Point and Cordes Junction. As of December 2025, the tree was still being decorated.

== Background ==
The 20-foot-tall (6.1 m) one-seed juniper (Juniperus monosperma) tree was decorated annually for over 30 years and is famous around the state. Unlike a traditional Christmas tree, it is actually shaped like a bush, being nearly as wide as it is tall. Decorations include Christmas ornaments, tinsel and garland, stuffed animals, bows, flags, and it is topped with a silver star. The tree is at a point where the terrain necessitated a wide separation between the northbound and southbound lanes of I-17, and the median is over 100 feet (30 m) wide. The median is under the jurisdiction of the Arizona Department of Transportation (ADOT), who have said "that for years, no one has been able to figure out who is responsible". The tree is surrounded by four water storage barrels and plastic drip tubing to supplement the sparse natural rainfall in the area. The irrigation system is also believed to have been installed by the unknown tree decorators. In 2013, ADOT spokesman Doug Nintzel said people have told him that they know who is responsible but have not said who it is.

The decorations are placed before Thanksgiving and removed after New Year's Day. In 2011, a former ADOT district engineer who retired in 2005 said he knew who decorates the tree but honors their request to remain anonymous. Due to the danger of stopping on the highway, neither ADOT nor the Arizona Department of Public Safety formally condone the activity in the median.

There are also patriotic decorations placed on the tree for the Fourth of July.

== Brush fires ==
The median is often the site of brush fires ignited by passing vehicles, and the tree has survived many of them. A fire in August 2011 was close enough to melt the tree's plastic irrigation system, but the tree was not seriously harmed even though the fire burned the surrounding vegetation and scorched some of the tree's lower branches. Some reports say the fire burned out on its own, while others say the tree was helped by ADOT employees, as well as citizens and "a firefighter or two".

ADOT employees say they "have seen the tree somehow survive over and over again". The tree was saved again in August 2019 by firefighters. The fire, however, left the tree too unstable to decorate. In 2021, Nancy Loftis of Phoenix revealed that she and her family had been decorating the tree and explained why they ended the tradition after the 2019 fire; she also expressed hope that the family would find a new tree to continue the tradition.

== Song ==
Dolan Ellis, Arizona's Official State Balladeer since 1966, has composed a song about the tree that he named "Scrubby".

== See also ==
- List of individual trees
