= Siege of Naco =

Part of the Escobar Rebellion (1929)

- Part of the Escobar Rebellion
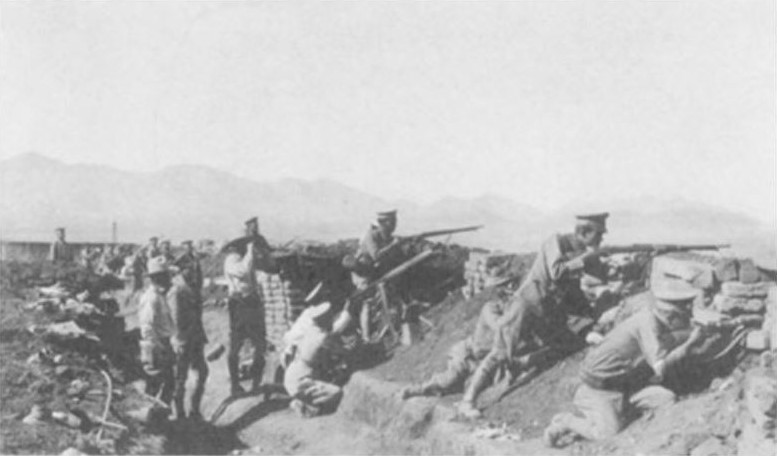
- Federal forces positioned in a trench during the siege.
Date	March 31 – April 6, 1929
Location	Naco, Sonora, Mexico
Result	Government victory

Belligerents
(Mexico) Mexican Government	Escobar rebels

The siege of Naco was a major battle fought in the border town of Naco, Sonora, Mexico, between March 31 and April 6, 1929, during the Escobar Rebellion. Following their capture of Cananea in 1928 and the drafting of the "Plan of Hermosillo", rebel forces under the command of General José Gonzalo Escobar occupied Agua Prieta and from there moved to take control of Naco, which at the time was a small, dusty village opposite of Naco, Arizona, United States, occupied by government forces loyal to President Emilio Portes Gil. The rebels hoped to fund the revolution using the revenue generated by Naco and Agua Prieta, where there was a significant amount of public support for their cause.

== The siege ==
Both factions hired American mercenaries who could pilot a biplane and drop bombs. On March 29, American pilots fighting for the rebels dropped leaflets over Naco, Sonora, warning the citizens of the coming battle. A few days later, on March 31, the rebel attack on Naco began with a train car loaded with explosives and sent whirling down the tracks to explode in the center of town. However, the train car derailed prematurely and exploded without hitting its intended target. After this failed, rebel pilots dropped improvised aerial bombs on the federal troops, and even managed to wound several American bystanders watching the battle from their side of the border.

At 7:45 am on April 2, an Irish pilot named Patrick Murphy mistakenly dropped two bombs on the Arizona side of the international border, while bombing targets on the Sonora side. One window was shattered and a man received a minor injury in what became the first aerial bombardment of the contiguous United States by a foreign power in American history. Additional bombs landed on the Arizona side of the border over the following days, prompting the United States Army to send in Buffalo Soldiers from Fort Huachuca and warplanes from Texas to protect Naco, Arizona, from further harm.

On April 5, a Mexican Air Force plane was shot down while bombing rebel forces a few miles south of Naco, Sonora. Both the pilot and the bomb dropper were killed and their bodies were brought into town under a flag of truce for burial later that night. In response, General Topete announced that out of respect for them, he would not bomb Naco that evening. Both victims were under the command of Major Rayma L. Andrews, an American air combat veteran under contract by the Mexican government to lead a detachment of bombers. Andrews flew multiple bombing missions against rebel supply centers and troop concentrations in Naco. His 25-pound fragmentation bombs and 100-pound demolition bombs were supplied by the United States government.

Just prior to April 6, twelve attack planes and six observation planes were dispatched by the order of U.S. Major General William Lassiter from Fort Crockett in Texas to provide additional air support on the U.S. side of the border.

The siege lasted until April 6, when the rebels launched their final and ultimately unsuccessful attack to take control of the town. The rebel pilots also went into action for a final time, and again Murphy managed to drop a few bombs on the Arizona side of the border, causing a significant amount of damage to several buildings and wounded more innocent bystanders. When the rebels were repulsed the last time, they retreated to Cananea by way of Agua Prieta, leaving the Federals in control of the town. Patrick Murphy was shot down by the Federals the following day, but managed to escape into Arizona, where he was arrested and later released by American authorities. Defeat in the siege of Naco marked the beginning of the end of the rebellion in northern Mexico. The war would come to end less than two months later, following another major battle and rebel defeat in the town of Jimenez, Chihuahua.

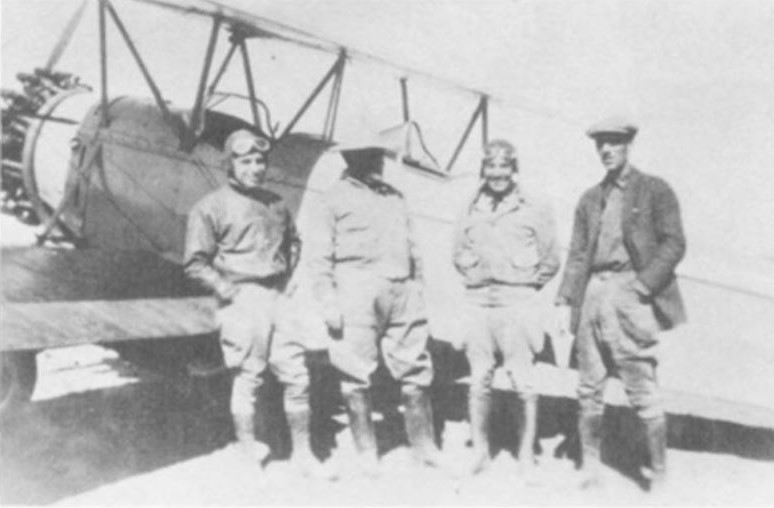
Major Rayma L. Andrews (far right), a Mexican colonel and two pilots during the siege of Naco on April 4, 1929. Both of the pilots wearing goggles were shot down and killed on the following day.

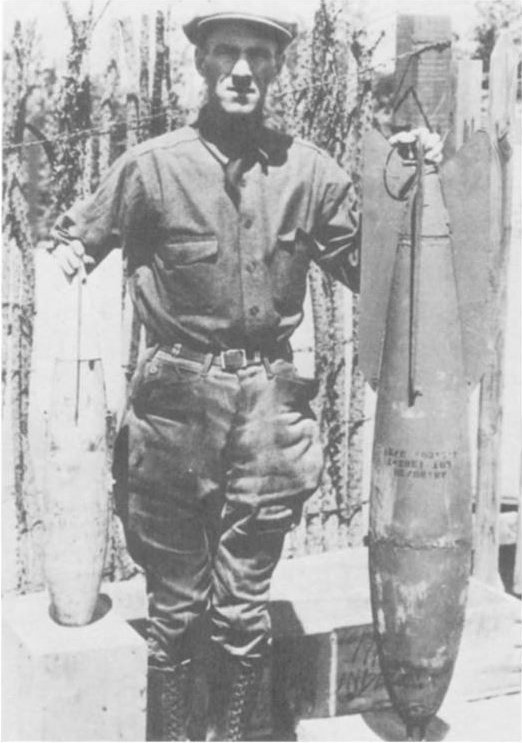
Major Andrews stands with a 25-pound fragmentation bomb and a 100-pound demolition bomb.

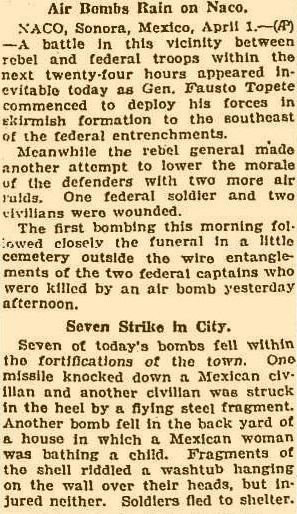
Newspaper clipping from the April 2, 1929, edition of the Chicago Daily Tribune concerning the siege.

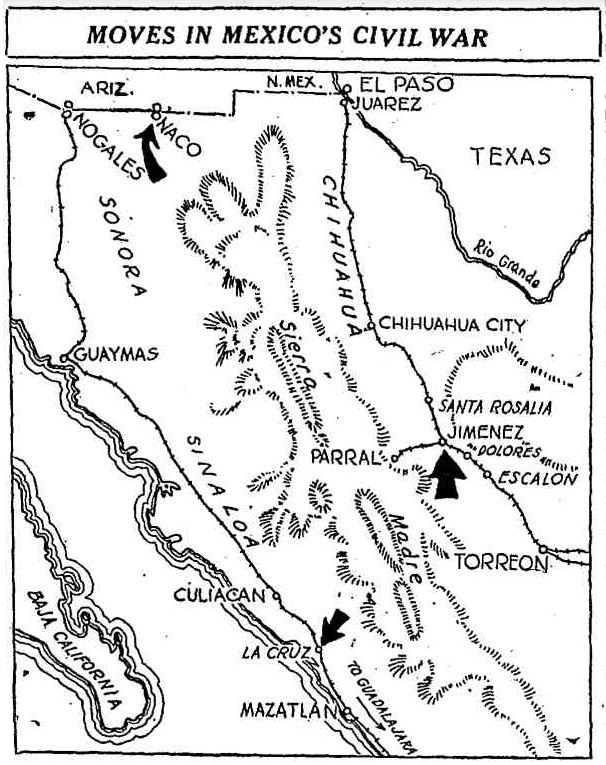
Map showing key locations

== See also ==
- Cristero War
