= Nobuo Fujita =

Japanese naval aviator

- 藤田 信雄
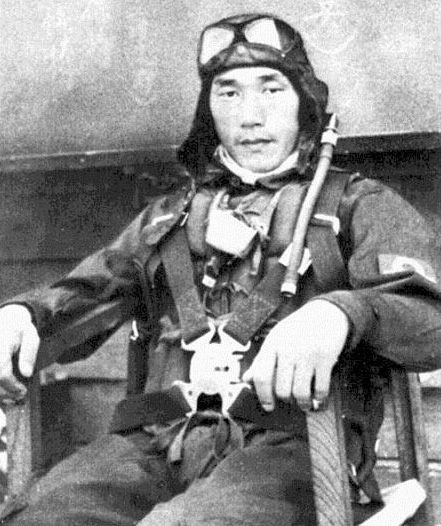
- Born: 1911; Bungotakada, Ōita, Japan
- Died: 30 September 1997 (aged 85); Tsuchiura, Ibaraki, Japan
- Burial place: Brookings, Oregon
- Military career
- Allegiance: Empire of Japan
- Branch: (Empire of Japan) Imperial Japanese Navy
- Service years: 1932–1945
- Rank: Sub-Lieutenant
- Conflicts: World War II; Pacific War; Attack on Pearl Harbor; Battle of the Aleutian Islands; Attack on Fort Stevens; Lookout Air Raid
- Other work: Businessman; Unofficial ambassador for Brookings, Oregon.

Nobuo Fujita (藤田 信雄, Fujita Nobuo; 1911 – 30 September 1997) was a Japanese naval aviator of the Imperial Japanese Navy who flew a floatplane from the long-range submarine aircraft carrier I-25 and conducted the Lookout Air Raids in southern Oregon on September 9, 1942, making him the only Axis pilot during World War II to aerial bomb the contiguous United States. Using incendiary bombs, his mission was to start massive forest fires in the Pacific Northwest near the city of Brookings, Oregon, with the objective of drawing the U.S. military's resources away from the Pacific Theater. The strategy was also later used in the Japanese fire balloon campaign.

In 1962 Fujita was invited to Brookings where he gave his family's 400-year-old katana to the city in friendship, Fujita later sponsored a trip for Brookings high school students to visit Japan in 1985 and returned to the city again in 1990, 1992, and 1995. In 1997, a few days before his death, Fujita was made an honorary citizen of the city.

== Early life and military career ==
=== Early life ===
Nobuo Fujita joined the Imperial Japanese Navy in 1932 and became a pilot in 1933. Fujita also had a younger brother who was killed in the war.

=== Pearl Harbor and U.S. West Coast ===
A photo believed to be Fujita's E14Y "Glen" floatplane aboard the Japanese submarine I-25

Fujita was on board I-25 during the attack on Pearl Harbor, where the I-25 and three other submarines patrolled a line 193 km (120 mi) north of Oahu. Fujita's plane, a Yokosuka E14Y "Glen" seaplane, did not function properly, and he was unable to participate in the reconnaissance mission planned before the attack.

After the attack on Pearl Harbor, I-25 patrolled along the West Coast of the United States with eight other submarines. They attacked U.S. shipping before returning to their base in Kwajalein Atoll in the Marshall Islands. They arrived there on January 11, 1942, to be refueled and refurbished.

=== South Pacific ===
I-25's next mission was to reconnoiter the Australian harbours of Sydney, Melbourne and Hobart, followed by the New Zealand harbours of Wellington and Auckland. On 17 February 1942, Nobuo Fujita took off in the "Glen" for a reconnaissance flight over Sydney Harbour to examine the city's airbase. By 07:30, he had returned to I-25, disassembled the "Glen" and stowed it in the water-tight hangar.

The next mission was a similar flight over Melbourne, Australia. Fujita took off from Cape Wickham on King Island at the western end of Bass Strait, about halfway between Victoria and Tasmania. The floatplane was launched on 26 February at 3AM for its flight to Melbourne over Port Phillip Bay. During the flight, Fujita recorded details of the bayside industrial areas and shipping activity, as well as noting the presence of one light cruiser, and five destroyers.

Fujita's next reconnaissance flight in Australia was over Hobart on 1 March. I-25 then headed for New Zealand, where Fujita flew a reconnaissance flight over Wellington on 8 March. He flew over Auckland on 13 March, followed by Fiji on 17 March. The submarine returned to its base at Kwajalein on 31 March.

=== Pacific Northwest ===
On 28 May, Fujita performed a reconnaissance of Kodiak, Alaska, in preparation for the invasion of the Aleutian Islands. On 21 June, I-25 shelled the U.S. base of Fort Stevens, near Astoria, Oregon. Fujita was on the deck of I-25 during the attack.

=== Bombing Oregon ===
Fujita himself suggested the idea of a submarine-based seaplane to bomb military targets, including ships at sea, and attacks on the U.S. mainland, especially the strategic Panama Canal. The idea was approved, and the mission was given to I-25. Submarine aircraft carriers such as the giant I-400-class submarines would be developed specifically to bomb the Panama Canal.

At 06:00 on 9 September, I-25 surfaced west of the Oregon/California border where she launched her E14Y floatplane, flown by Fujita and Petty Officer Okuda Shoji, with a 154 kg (340 lb) load of two incendiary bombs. Fujita dropped two bombs, one on Wheeler Ridge on Mount Emily in Oregon. The location of the other bomb is unknown. The Wheeler Ridge bomb started a small fire 16 km (9.9 mi) due east of Brookings, which U.S. Forest Service employees were able to extinguish. Rain the night before had made the forest very damp, and the bombs were rendered essentially ineffective. Fujita's plane had been spotted by two men, Howard Gardner and Bob Larson, at the Mount Emily fire lookout tower in the Siskiyou National Forest. Two other lookouts (the Chetco Point Lookout and the Long Ridge Lookout) reported the plane, but could not see it due to heavy fog. The plane was seen and heard by many people, especially when Fujita flew over Brookings in both directions. At about noon that day, Howard Gardner at the Mount Emily Lookout reported seeing smoke. The four U.S. Forest Service employees discovered that the fire was caused by a Japanese bomb. Approximately 27 kg (60 lb) of fragments, including the nose of the bomb, were turned over to the United States Army.

After the bombing, I-25 came under attack by a USAAF aircraft on patrol, forcing the submarine to dive and hide on the ocean floor off Port Orford. The American attacks caused only minor damage, and Fujita flew a second bombing sortie three weeks later on 29 September. Fujita used the Cape Blanco Light as a beacon. After 90 minutes flying east, he dropped his bombs and reported seeing flames, but the bombing remained unnoticed in the U.S.

The submarine torpedoed and sank the SS Camden and SS Larry Doheny and then sailed for home. On its way to Japan, I-25 sank the Soviet submarine L-16, which was in transit between Dutch Harbor, Alaska, and San Francisco, California, mistaking it for an American submarine (Japan and the USSR were not at war at the time).

The two attacks on Oregon in September 1942 were the only enemy aircraft bombings on the contiguous United States and were the second time the continental United States was attacked by such aircraft during World War II, following the bombing of Dutch Harbor in Unalaska, Alaska three months earlier. This strategy of using forest fires as a weapon in World War II is cited in Smokey Bear's website as the motivating force behind the Wildfire PSA campaign.

=== Post-bombing ===
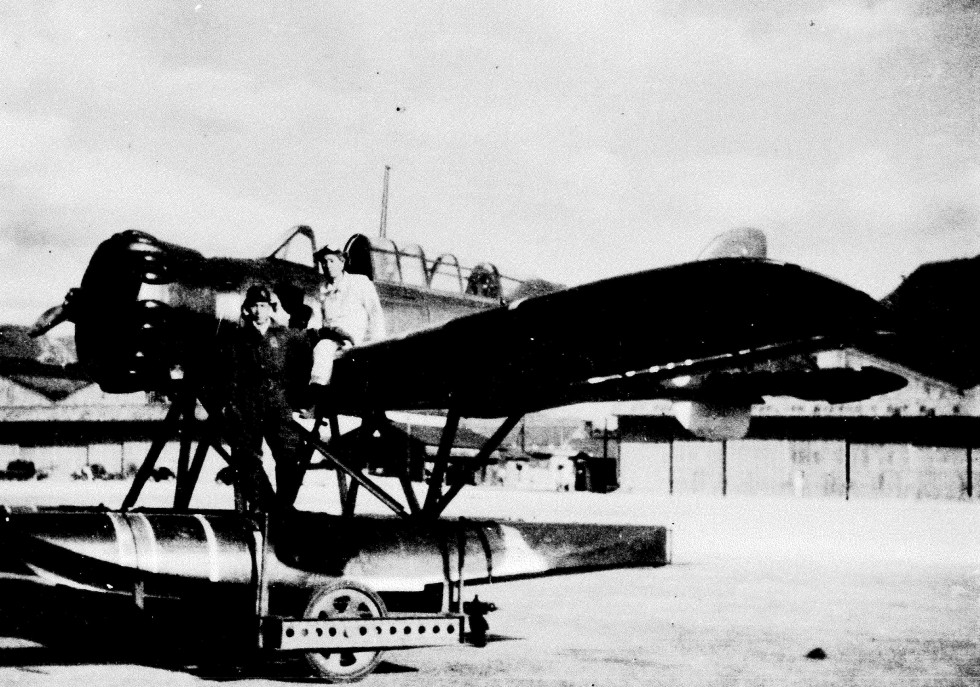
Nobuo Fujita standing by his Yokosuka E14Y "Glen", 1943-1944

Fujita continued as an Imperial Japanese Navy pilot, mainly in reconnaissance duties, and was promoted to the rank of Ensign. In 1943 he was transferred to the Kashima Naval Air Corps, a seaplane training and later a mainland air defense unit, where he served as an instructor attached to the aviation squadron. In February 1945 while flying a Mitsubishi F1M reconnaissance floatplane Fujita was involved in the interception and unconfirmed downing of an American Grumman F6F Hellcat.

Just before the end of the war Fujita volunteered to join the Kamikaze Special Attack Force and he was transferred to the Kawa Naval Air Corps where he trained kamikaze pilots and prepared to take part in an attack himself. Kawanishi N1K Kyōfū floatplanes were used for the training but because of multiple factors including poor visibility and the difficulty for crew members with little flight experience to take off and land on water Fujita did not perform any missions before the war's end. After the war but before his demobilization Fujita was promoted to Sub-Lieutenant.

== Later life ==
After the war he opened a hardware store in Ibaraki Prefecture and later worked at a company making wire.

Fujita was invited to Brookings in 1962 by the local Jaycees, after the Japanese government was assured he would not be tried as a war criminal. He gave the City of Brookings his family's 400-year-old katana in friendship. Fujita had intended to use the sword to commit seppuku if he should be arrested as a war crimes suspect. Although his visit still raised some controversy, the town treated him with respect and affection, while US president John F. Kennedy congratulated the town on their efforts to promote international friendship.

Impressed by his welcome in the United States during his visit, he promised to invite Brookings students to Japan. Despite the bankruptcy of his company, Fujita made good on his promise by co-sponsoring the visit of three students from Brookings-Harbor High School to Japan in 1985. During the visit, Fujita received a US flag flown over the US Capitol Building and a dedicatory letter from an aide on behalf of President Ronald Reagan "with admiration for your kindness and generosity." Both are now on display at the Nobuo Fujita Corner of the Japan Ground Self-Defense Force's Camp Kasumigaura Public Relations Center near Tsuchiura.

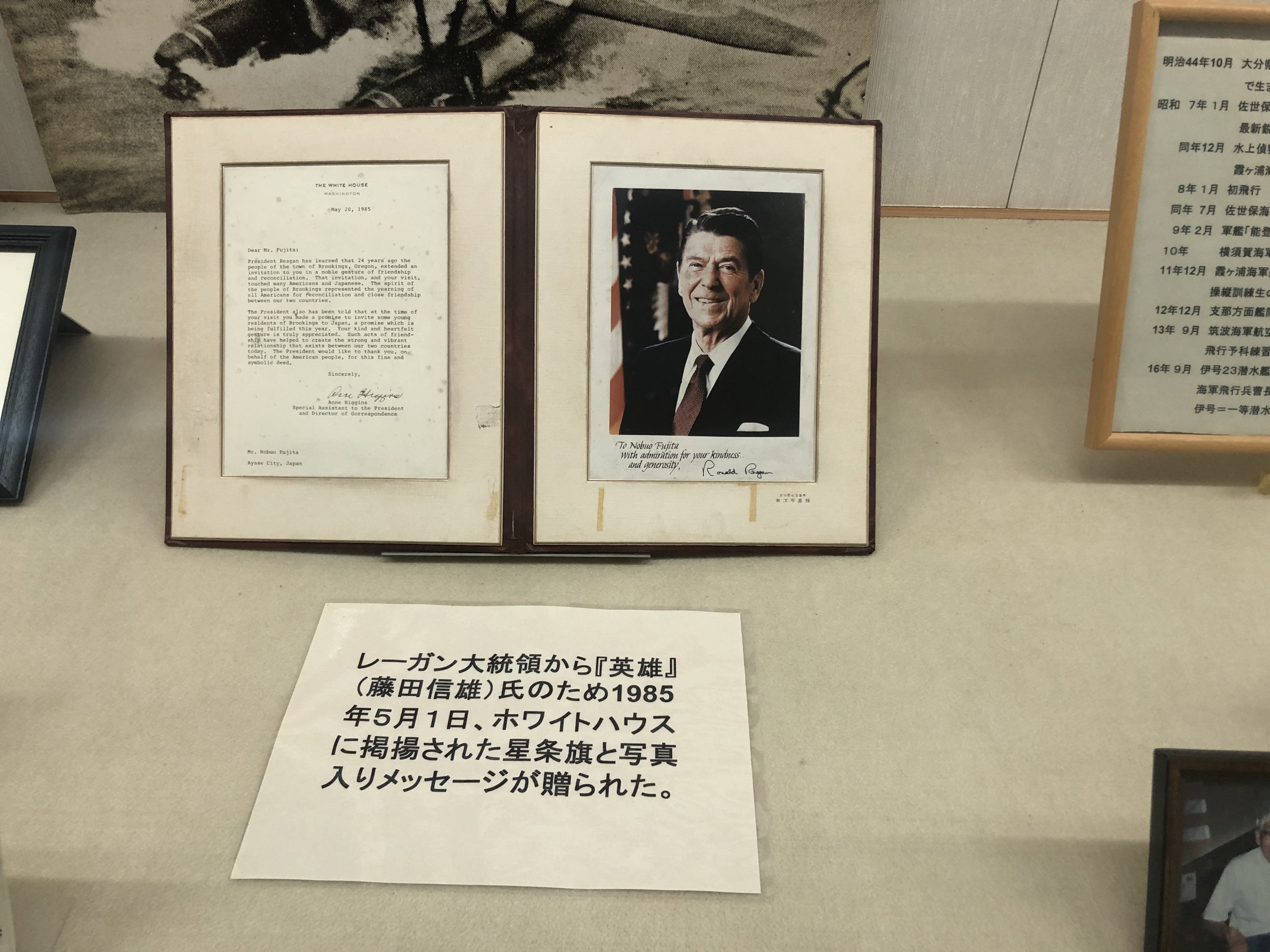
Letter of appreciation from Ronald Reagan to Fujita

Fujita returned to Brookings in 1990, 1992, and 1995. In 1992, he planted a tree at the bomb site as a gesture of peace. In 1995, he moved the samurai sword from the Brookings City Hall into the new library's display case. Fujita helped to gather money to build the library. He was later named an "ambassador of goodwill" by the city for his continued peace efforts.

Fujita was made an honorary citizen of Brookings while hospitalized for lung cancer in Tsuchiura; he died a few days later on September 30, 1997, at the age of 85. In October 1998, his daughter, Yoriko Asakura, buried some of Fujita's ashes at the bomb site near Brookings. According to local resident Brenda Jacques his daughter told her that “part of [her father’s] soul would forever be flying over Mount Emily.”

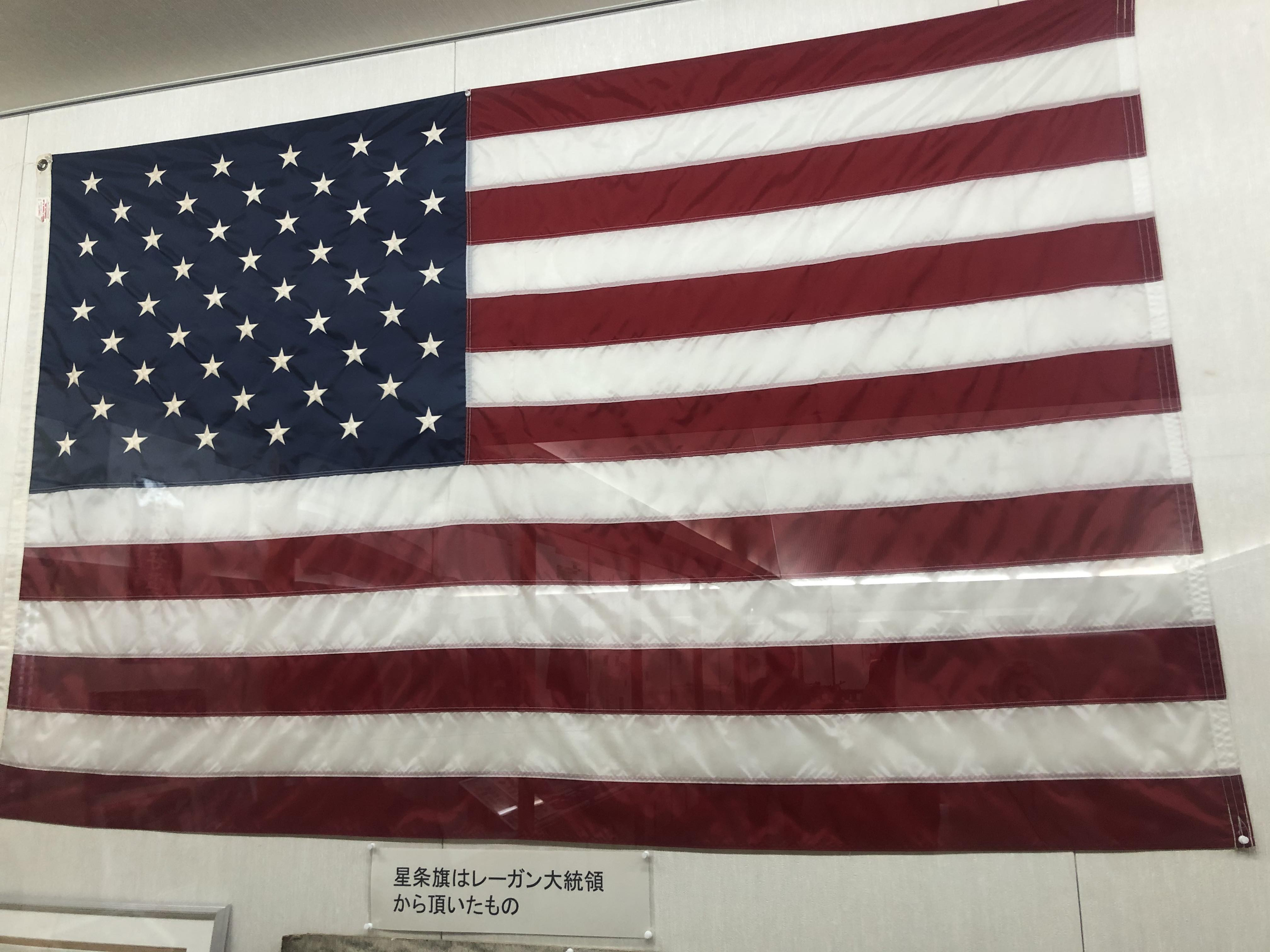
American flag flown over the capitol given to Fujita

== See also ==
- Attacks on North America during World War II
