= Naco, Arizona =

CDP in Cochise County, Arizona

- CDP
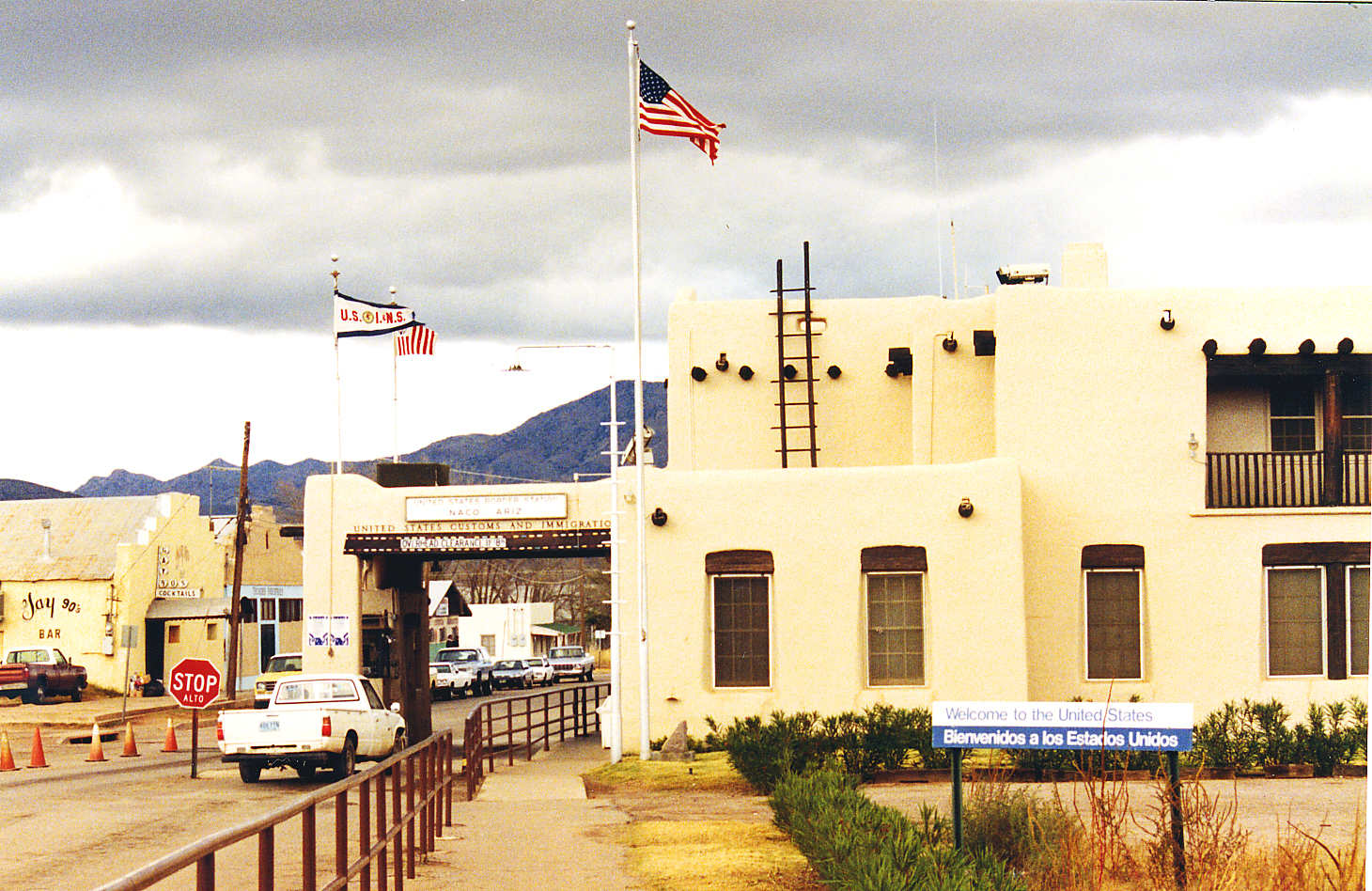
- US Customhouse at Naco, Arizona

- Location in the United States Naco (the United States)
- Coordinates: 31°20′36″N 109°56′00″W
- Country: United States
- State: Arizona
- County: Cochise

Area
  - Total: 3.23 sq mi (8.37 km^{2})
  - Land: 3.23 sq mi (8.37 km^{2})
  - Water: 0 sq mi (0.00 km^{2})
- Elevation: 4,570 ft (1,390 m)

Population (2020)
  - Total: 824
  - Density: 255.0/sq mi (98.45/km^{2})
- Time zone: UTC-7 (Mountain (MST))
- ZIP code: 85620
- Area code: 520
- FIPS code: 04-48310
- GNIS feature ID: 2408897

Naco is a census-designated place (CDP) located in Cochise County, Arizona, United States. Naco had a recorded population of 1,046 at the 2010 United States census. Located directly across the United States–Mexico border from its sister city of Naco, Sonora, Naco is best known for an accidental 1929 air raid and is the first and only municipality in the Continental United States to have been aerially bombed by foreigners.

== History ==
The present-day unincorporated town of Naco, Arizona, was established in the early 20th century. The area was originally settled by the Nahua and Opata Indians. Naco means "nopal cactus" in the Opata language. The U.S. Congress officially established Naco as a Port of Entry on June 28, 1902. Today, the Naco port of entry is open 24 hours per day.

Occasionally the people on both sides of the border use the border fence as the net in a volleyball game.

=== 1929 air raid ===
The accidental 1929 Bombing of Naco by Irish-American mercenary Patrick Murphy is notable for being the first and only instance where a town in the Continental United States was bombed by aircraft working for a foreign power. The 1942 Lookout Air Raids, when a Japanese floatplane pilot made two unsuccessful attempts to start forest fires in rural Oregon, and the 1944-45 unmanned Fu-Go Fire balloon attacks, also by the Japanese, are the only other cases of the Continental United States enduring aerial bombing by a foreign power. Such events are exceptionally rare in American history because during 20th century conflicts, most notably World War I and World War II, the continental United States escaped the large-scale aerial bombings that devastated many Asian and European cities.

The background to the bombing of Naco started in early 1929, when José Gonzalo Escobar led a rebellion against the government of Emilio Portes Gil. Mexican federal troops dug in around Naco,

Patrick Murphy was an aviator who owned his own bi-winged airplane and performed tricks with it. Murphy decided to help the rebels by offering to build homemade bombs and drop them on federal positions. His offer was accepted by the rebels, who promised a reward. Three of his bombs inadvertently landed on the Arizona side of the border, hitting various buildings in Naco.

== Geography ==
According to the United States Census Bureau, the CDP has a total area of 3.4 square miles (8.8 km^{2}), all land.

== Attractions ==
Naco was home to the Turquoise Valley Golf Course, the oldest continuously operated golf course in Arizona—the first to reach 100 continuous years of age. It was purchased from long time owner Pete Lawson by HGM Golf Enterprises in May 2015. The ownership changed hands three more times when Joseph Lewis, a real estate developer from Phoenix, in June 2018. The course was permanently closed in June 2019.

== Demographics ==
Historical population
Census	Pop.	Note	%±
2020	824		—
U.S. Decennial Census

As of the U.S. 2010 census, there were 1046 people, 334 households, and 284 families residing in the CDP. The population density was 307.6 inhabitants per square mile (118.8/km^{2}). The racial makeup of the CDP was 62.8% White, 0.67% Native American, 33.7% from other races, and 2.88% from two or more races. 83.9% of the population were Hispanic or Latino of any race.

There were 334 households, out of which 146 had children under the age of 18 living with them.

In the CDP, the age distribution of the population shows 40.5% under the age of 18, 5.9% from 18 to 24, 11% from 25 to 34, 15.8% from 35 to 49, 15% from 50 to 64, and 11.7% who were 65 years of age or older. The population of Naco, by 2010 census estimates, is 48.7% male, 51.3% female.

According to the 2000 census, the median income for a household in the CDP was $22,045, and the median income for a family was $25,227. Males had a median income of $21,923 versus $15,882 for females. The per capita income for the CDP was $9,169. About 33.0% of families and 34.2% of the population were below the poverty line, including 46.1% of those under age 18 and 25.4% of those age 65 or over.

== Prehistoric Naco ==
The Naco-Mammoth Kill Site is located near Naco. Excavations from this archeological site in the 1950s revealed mammoth bones with embedded Clovis points, providing evidence of the hunting activities of Paleo-Indians some 13,000 years ago.

== Fort Naco ==
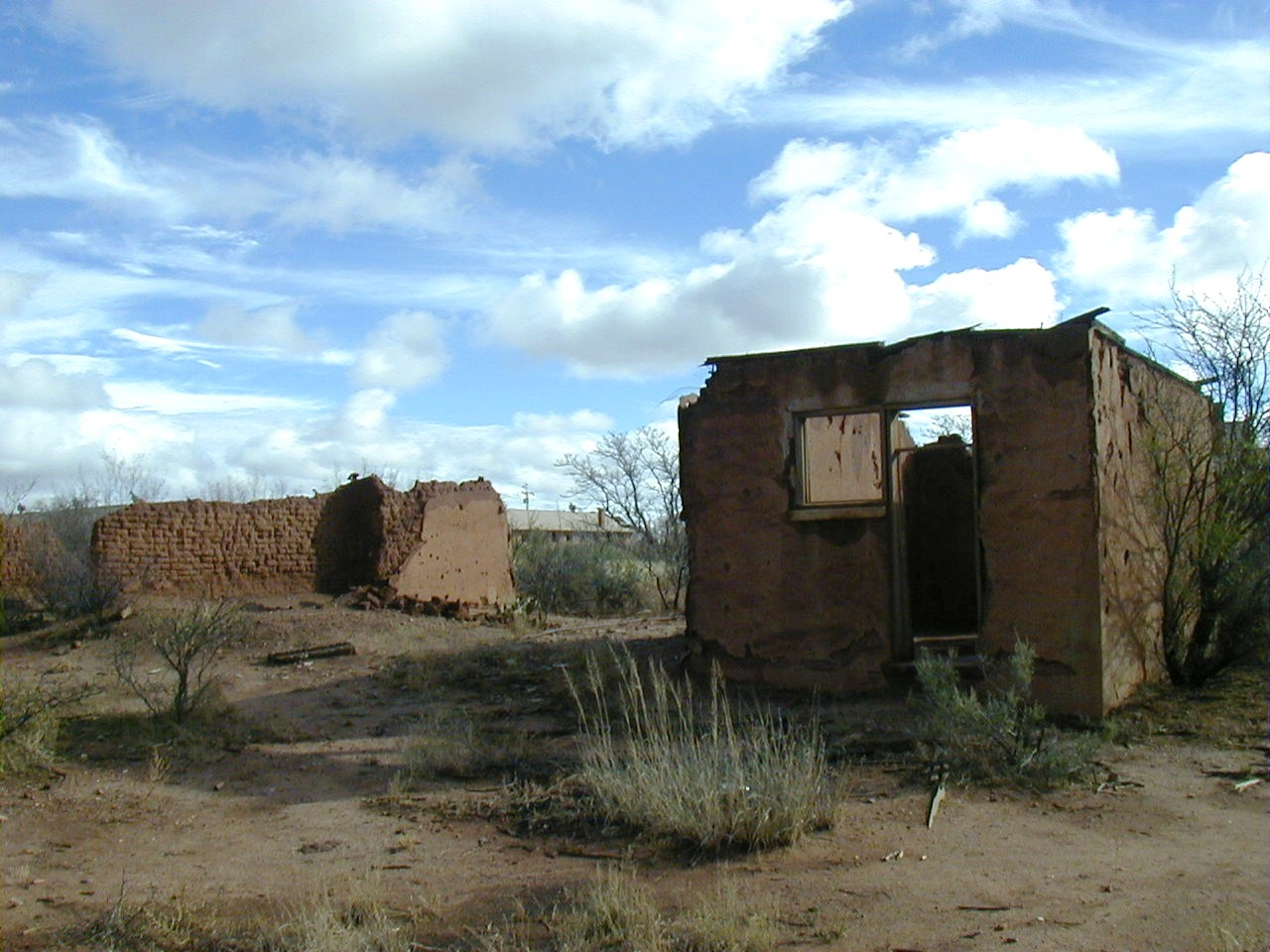
Fort Naco, located on the outskirts of Naco, Arizona

Fort Naco is a former military post on the outskirts of Naco. Subsequent to Pancho Villa's raid on Columbus, New Mexico, in 1916, Fort Naco was a staging area for American troops protecting the border. It was the headquarters of the 1st Infantry Regiment of the Arizona National Guard.

== Transportation ==
The Bisbee Bus provides public transportation from Naco to Bisbee.

== See also ==
- Bombing of Naco – the first ever aerial bombardment of the contiguous United States by a foreign power
