= Lookout Air Raids =

Japanese air raids on Oregon during WWII

- Part of the American theater of the Pacific War
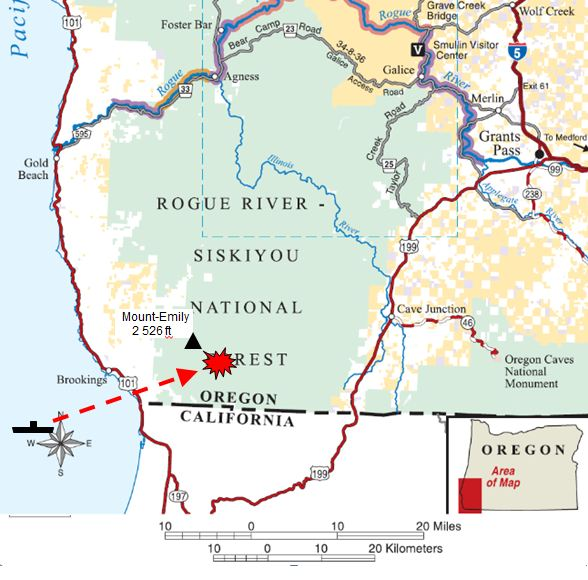
- Lookout air raid schema
Date	September 9 and September 29, 1942
Location	Klamath Mountains, near Brookings, Oregon, United States
Result	Japanese success in dropping bombs causing small fires; however, failed to ignite large intended forest fire.

Belligerents
United States	Japan

Commanders and leaders
Keith V. Johnson	Tagami Akiji; Nobuo Fujita

Strength
1 patrol of fire lookouts	Sea: 1 submarine Air: 1 aircraft

The Lookout Air Raids were two air raids carried out by the Empire of Japan in the Klamath Mountains of Oregon in September 1942.

On September 9, 1942, a Japanese Yokosuka E14Y Glen floatplane, launched from a Japanese submarine, dropped two incendiary bombs with the intention of starting a forest fire. However, with the efforts of a patrol of fire lookouts and weather conditions not amenable to a fire, the damage done by the attack was minor. The attack was the first time the contiguous United States was bombed by an enemy aircraft. (Note: As well as only the second time in history that the contiguous U.S. was bombed by someone working for a foreign power, the first being the bombing of Naco, Arizona by Patrick Murphy, although the Murphy bombing inside the U.S. was an accident.) It was also the second time the continental United States was attacked by enemy aircraft during World War II, the first being the bombing of Dutch Harbor three months earlier.

== Lookout Air Raids ==
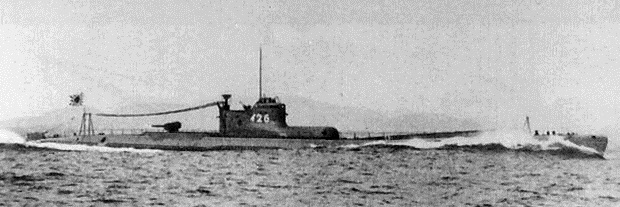
The Japanese Submarine I-26, a sister vessel to the I-25. Note the aircraft hangar immediately forward of the conning tower.

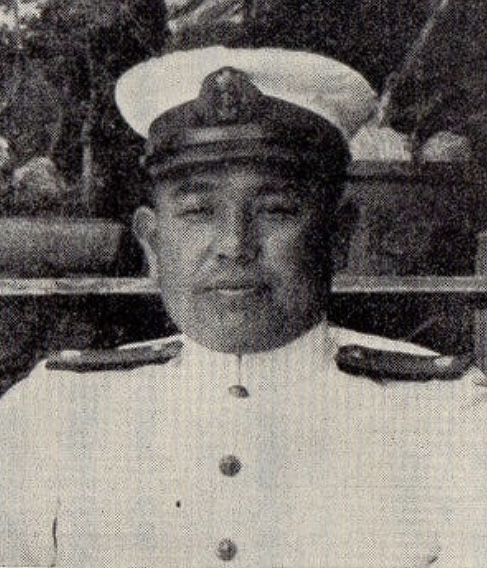
Lt. Cmdr. Meiji (Akiji) Tagami

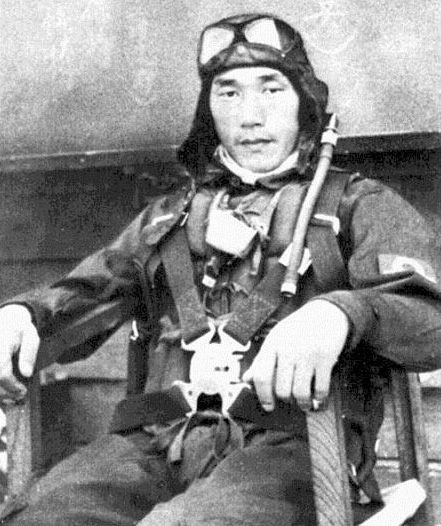
Warrant Officer Nobuo Fujita

On Wednesday morning, September 9, 1942, the submarine I-25, under the command of Lieutenant Commander Akiji Tagami, surfaced west of Cape Blanco. The submarine launched a "Glen" Yokosuka E14Y floatplane, flown by Warrant Officer Nobuo Fujita and Petty Officer Okuda Shoji, with a load of two incendiary bombs of 76 kilograms (168 lb) each.

Howard "Razz" Gardner spotted and reported the incoming "Glen" from his fire lookout tower on Mount Emily in the Siskiyou National Forest.

Although Razz did not see the bombing, he saw the smoke plume and reported the fire to the dispatch office. He was instructed to hike to the fire to see what suppression he could do. Dispatch also sent USFS Fire Lookout Keith V. Johnson from the nearby Bear Wallow Lookout Tower. Fujita dropped two bombs, one on Wheeler Ridge on Mount Emily in Oregon. The location of the other bomb is unknown. The Wheeler Ridge bomb started a small fire 16 km (9.9 mi) due east of Brookings.

The two men proceeded to the location and were able to keep the fire under control. Only a few small scattered fires were started because the bombs were not dropped from the correct height. The men stayed on scene and worked through the night keeping the fires contained. In the morning, a fire crew arrived to help. A recent rain storm had kept the area wet, which helped the fire lookouts contain the blaze.

== Aftermath ==
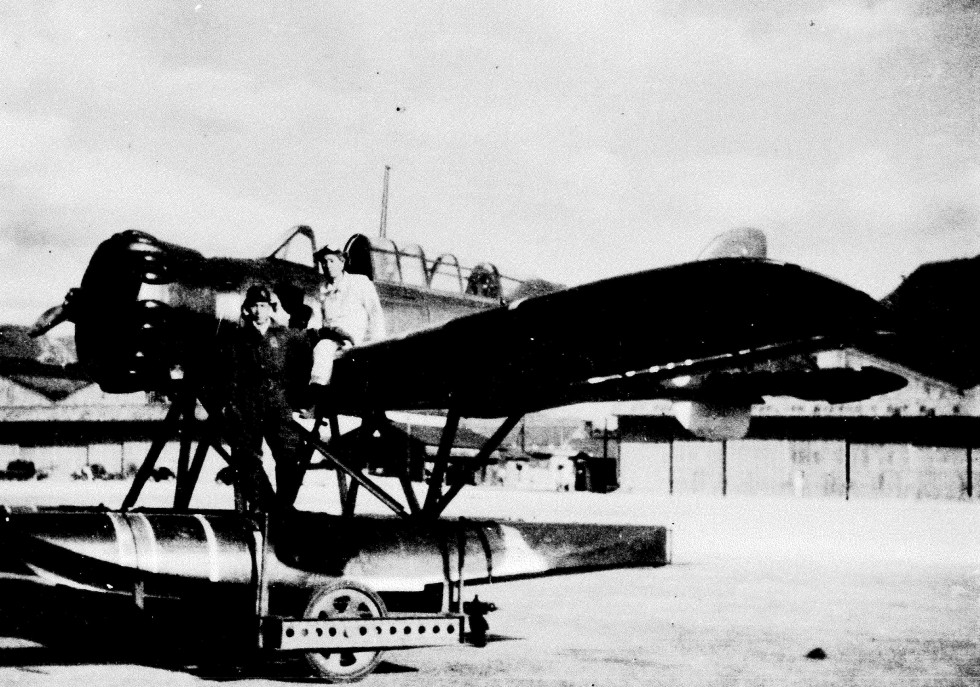
Nobuo Fujita standing by his Yokosuka E14Y "Glen" seaplane.

A full investigation was launched by the Federal Bureau of Investigation, which resulted in locating several bomb fragments. The story was reported in several newspapers on September 10, 1942. Lieut. Gen. John L. DeWitt, the area commander announced,

The Western Defense Command is investigating the circumstances surrounding the discovery on Sept. 9 of fragments of what appears to have been an incendiary bomb. These fragments were found by personnel of the United States Forestry Service near Mt. Emily nine miles northeast of Brookings, Or. Markings of the bomb fragments indicated that the missile was of Japanese origin.

The floatplane carried two bombs. Both were dropped, according to the Japanese records, but no trace has yet been found of the second bomb. One of the bombs left a foot-deep crater. Fujita and his observer made a second attack on September 29, again causing only negligible damage.

== Postwar ==
Twenty years later, Fujita was invited back to Brookings. Before he made the trip the Japanese government was assured he would not be tried as a war criminal. In Brookings, Fujita served as Grand Marshal for the local Azalea Festival. At the festival, Fujita presented his family's 400-year-old samurai sword to the city as a symbol of reconciliation. Fujita made a number of additional visits to Brookings, serving as an "informal ambassador of peace and friendship". Impressed by his welcome in the United States, in 1985 Fujita invited three students from Brookings to Japan. During the visit of the Brookings-Harbor High School students to Japan, Fujita received a dedicatory letter from an aide of President Ronald Reagan "with admiration for your kindness and generosity". Fujita returned to Brookings in 1990, 1992, and 1995. In 1992 he planted a tree at the bomb site as a gesture of peace. In 1995, he moved the samurai sword from the Brookings City Hall into the new library's display case. He was made an honorary citizen of Brookings several days before his death on September 30, 1997, at the age of 85. In October 1998, his daughter, Yoriko Asakura, buried some of Fujita's ashes at the bomb site.

== See also ==
- Doolittle Raid
- Amerikabomber
- Bombardment of Fort Stevens
- Fu-Go balloon bomb
- Operation K
