= Naco Border Station =

- U.S. National Register of Historic Places
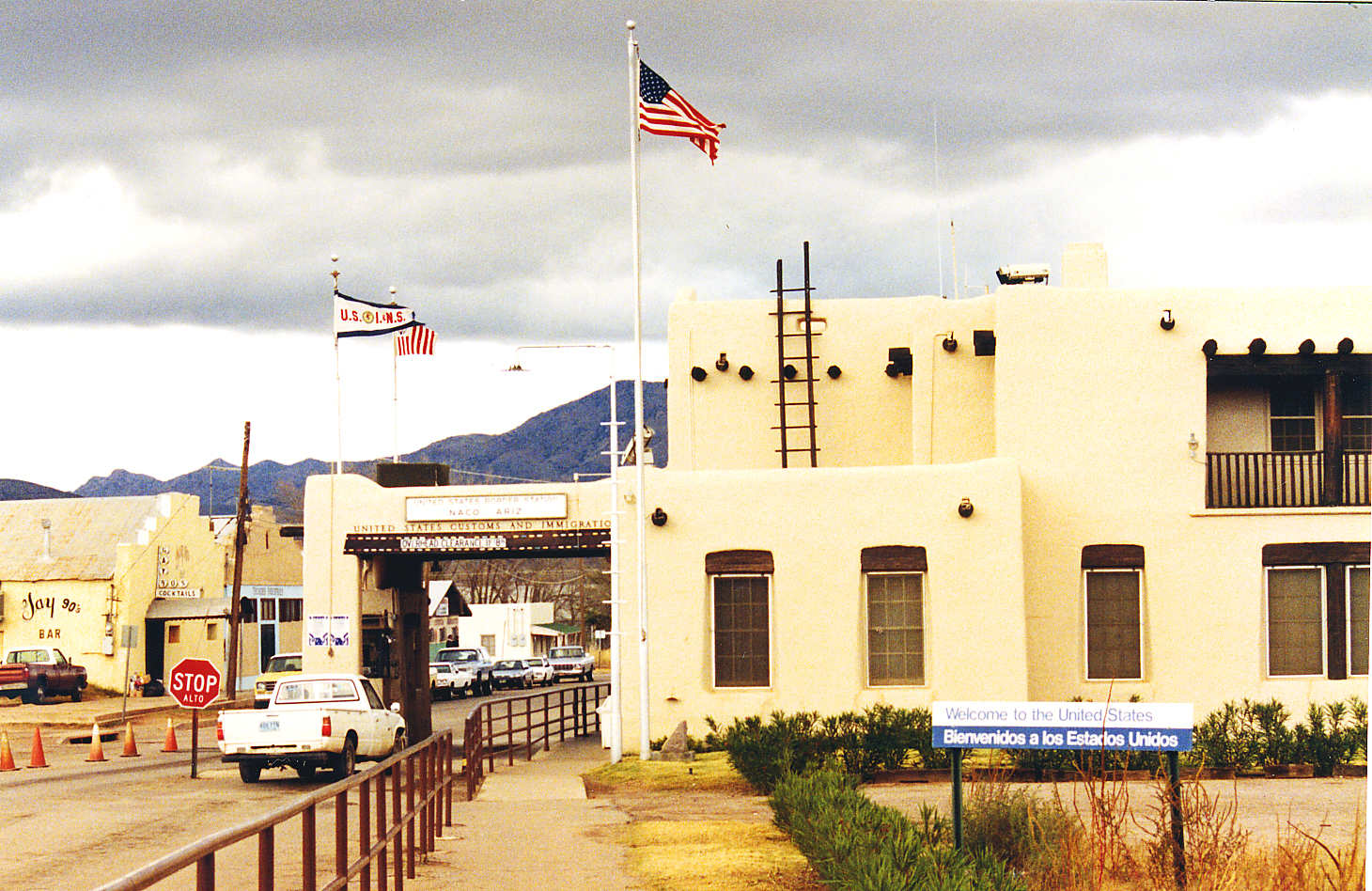
- Station in 1990

- Location within Arizona
- Location: 106 D St., Naco, Arizona
- Coordinates: 31°20′04″N 109°56′53″W
- Area: 0.4 acres (0.16 ha)
- Built: 1936
- Architect: Louis A. Simon; Neal A. Melick
- Architectural style: Late 19th and 20th Century Revivals, Pueblo Revival
- NRHP reference No.: 91000026
- Added to NRHP: February 19, 1991

Naco Arizona Port of Entry
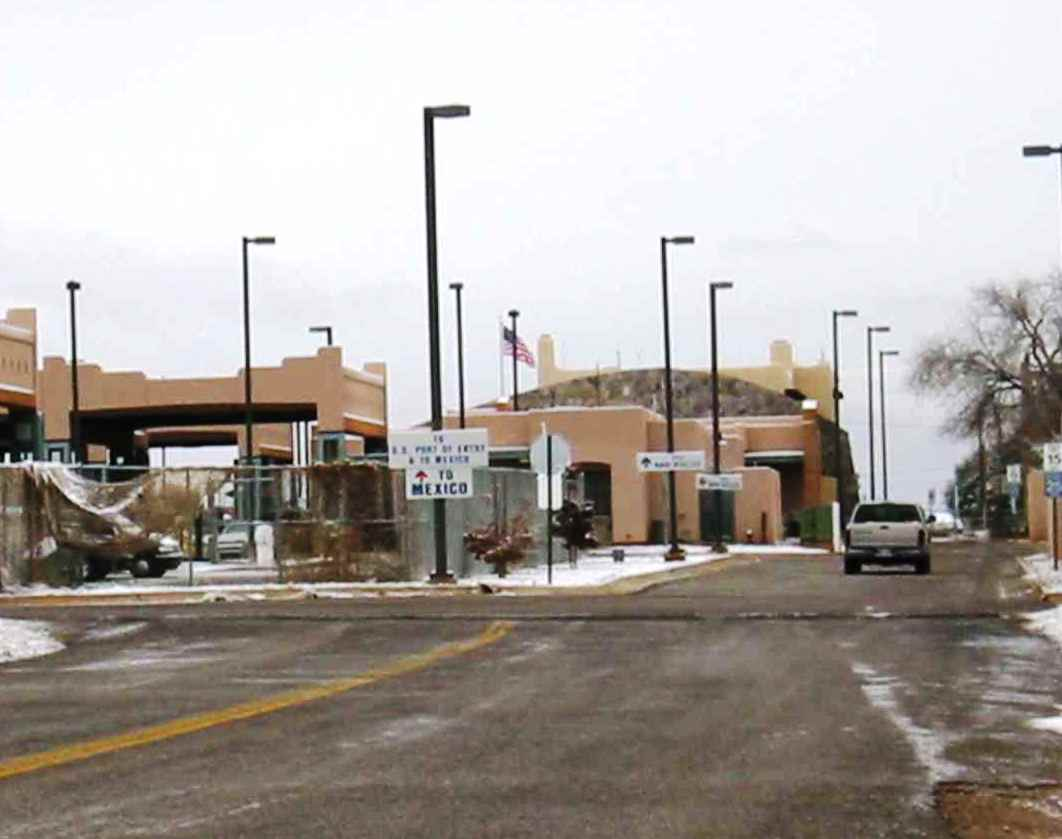
- Naco Arizona Port of Entry, December 2001

Details
- Opened: 1900

Statistics
- 2011 Cars: 465,186
- 2011 Trucks: 3,376
- Pedestrians: 79,115

Website
- http://www.cbp.gov/contact/ports/naco

The Naco, Arizona Border Station (Port of Entry) has been in existence for more than 100 years. The historic Adobe-style border station built in 1937 still stands and serves as CBP office space. A new border inspection station was built in adjacent space in 1994 by the General Services Administration. At one time, trains used to cross the border here as well, but train service ended early in the 20th Century. The building was listed on the National Register of Historic Places in 1991.

According to the GSA, it was built as part of a program to standardize and improve border stations using $165 million funding authorized by the Public Buildings Act of 1926. The Naco border station and others built during 1931–1943 "were a newly invented, modern building type designed in response to the advent of the automobile."

It is a U.S. customs and immigration station. Its National Register nomination asserted that its "main building is an exceptional example of the Pueblo Revival style". The two-story building is stuccoed and has "elaborate carved and painted decorations. Features of the building which are typical of the Pueblo style include flat roofs, battered and rounded walls, parapet walls, cutouts, terraces, verandas, roughly hewn rafters and cross pieces (vigas and latias), water spouts (canales), and hewn window lintels. There is also a porte cochere on the front of the building and a decorative, rough-hewn ladder. It has an unusually fine degree of artistry and integrity of the original design which make it unique among southern border stations and an exceptional example of Pueblo style buildings."

Its distinctive architectural design is credited to Louis A. Simon and Neal A. Melick.

It is located at 106 D St. in Naco. It has also been known, at least locally, as the "US Customhouse" and as the "US Inspection Station.

Its hours of operation presumably reflect the transportation requirements of Americans, Mexicans, and others, and staffing for administration purposes which can be made available: in 2022, its office hours are 6:00 a.m. to 10:00 p.m. daily, its passenger processing is open 24 hours per day, and its cargo processing is open 9:00 a.m. to 5:00 p.m. on weekdays only.

== See also ==
- List of Mexico–United States border crossings
