= Patrick Murphy (pilot) =

American pilot who bombed Naco, Arizona

Patrick Murphy was an Irish-American pilot who mistakenly bombed the border town of Naco, Arizona in April 1929 during the Escobar Rebellion. Little is known of his personal life, though he may have come from Ardmore, Oklahoma.

== Bombing of Naco ==
Murphy owned a biplane around the time of the Cristero War (also known as "The Cristiada") in Mexico against the purportedly anti-Catholic and secular government of Emilio Portes Gil. Murphy was hired to aid the rebels by using his biplane to bomb the government-controlled town of Naco, Sonora. He made several attempts in 1929 between March 31 and April 6 to bomb Naco but also, apparently accidentally, bombed the Arizona border town of the same name, destroying various buildings and a car. His poor accuracy has been variously blamed on high winds perhaps combined with the consumption of alcohol by either himself, his 'bombardier', or both. The plane was eventually shot down by Mexican 'Federales' troops, but Murphy escaped to rebel territory.

Murphy, along with other Mexican rebel troops and pilots, surrendered to US authorities in Nogales, Arizona on April 30. He was charged with "violating the neutrality of the United States".

== Legacy ==
Murphy became the first person working for a foreign power to ever bomb the mainland United States. The second was Nobuo Fujita during the 1942 Lookout Air Raids.

The balladeer Dolan Ellis honored Murphy in his song "The Bombing of Naco" from his album Tall Tales, Lost Trails & Heroes.
