= Escobar Rebellion =

Conflict in northern Mexico in 1929 during the Maximato

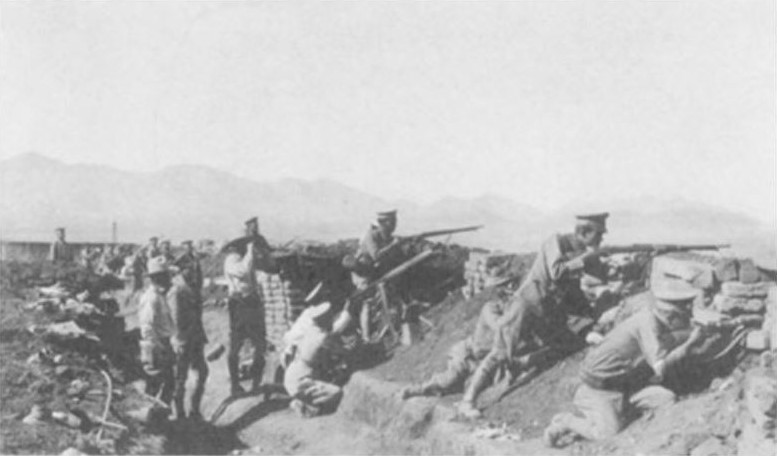
- Federal soldiers positioned in a trench during the siege of Naco.
Date	March 3–April 30, 1929
Location	Mexico, United States
Result	Mexican government victory

Belligerents
(Mexico) Mexican government	(Mexico) Army rebels

Commanders and leaders
(Mexico) Emilio Portes Gil (Mexico) Plutarco Elías Calles	José Gonzalo Escobar; Marcelino Murrieta; Fausto Topete; Jesus M. Aguirre (executed)

Strength
82,000+	35,000

Casualties and losses
- ≈2,000 killed

The Escobar Rebellion was a conflict in northern Mexico in 1929 during the Maximato, between the government forces of President Emilio Portes Gil and rebel forces under the command of General José Gonzalo Escobar. After some initial success in taking over several key cities in the northern half of the country, the Escobar rebels were decisively defeated in a major battle at Jiménez, Chihuahua, and were eventually swept aside by the advancing government forces under the command of General Calles.

== Background ==
The Escobar Rebellion was the last in a series of rebellions following the end of the Mexican civil war in 1920, when the left wing faction of Plutarco Elías Calles, Álvaro Obregón and Adolfo de la Huerta (collectively known as "The Sonoran Triangle") took control of the federal government from Venustiano Carranza under the Plan of Agua Prieta. Following the assassination of President-elect Obregón on July 17, 1928, and the end of Calles's term as president on November 30, the former governor of Tamaulipas, Emilio Portes Gil, was selected unanimously to succeed Calles as provisional president until a new election could be held the following year, in November 1929. As a civilian with no military experience, the selection of Portes Gil upset many officers in the Mexican military, now largely composed of the armies of individual revolutionary leaders, who wanted one of their own in office to continue the tradition of having a general for president. Earlier, Venustiano Carranza had attempted to impose a civilian to succeed him in the 1920 elections, leading to his ouster and death.

At the time, one of the Mexican Army's most popular and wealthy officers was General José Gonzalo Escobar, who was described as "brave, young and dashing" for his role in defeating Pancho Villa in the 1919 battle of Ciudad Juárez and for later involvement in crushing the de la Huerta revolt of 1923 and the Gómez-Serrano revolt in 1927. Although Escobar at first proclaimed his loyalty to Calles and his successor, neither president trusted him and both considered Escobar to be high on their list of troublesome generals. As Escobar was assuring Calles and Portes Gil of his loyalty, in secret he made plans to take control of the federal government and establish himself as president.

Drafting the "Plan of Hermosillo" late in 1928, Escobar planned to launch his rebellion the following spring, citing corruption in the Calles–Portes Gil government as the reason for the revolt, which was called the "Renovating Revolution" by Escobar and his men. Portes Gil, like Escobar, knew that the success of any rebellion would largely be determined by supplies brought in from the United States across the international border. Consequently, Portes Gil launched a "two-phase plan" to have the United States government seal the border to any potential rebel needs and also resupply the Mexican Army with war materiel, including modern combat aircraft. Both requests were granted in February 1929, just weeks before the opening of hostilities.

== Rebellion ==
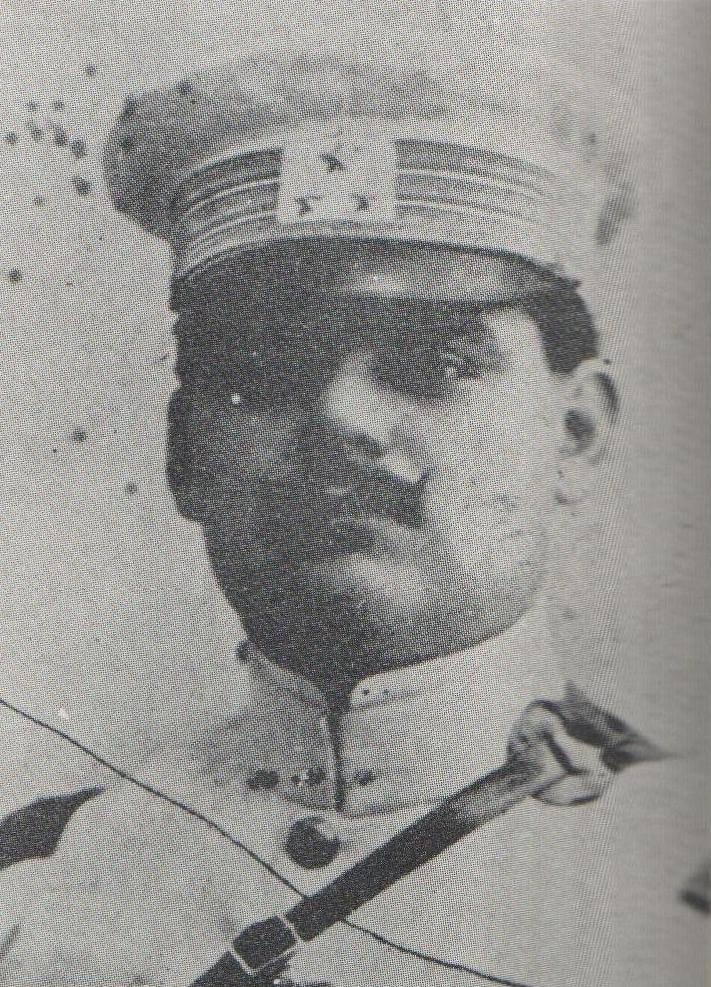
General José Gonzalo Escobar, as he appeared in a 1929 newspaper

The rebellion officially began on March 3, 1929. Escobar maintained his guise as a loyal subject for as long as he could, having sent a letter to Portes Gil offering his services just hours before leading an attack on the city of Monterrey, in Nuevo León. Many Mexican Army officers defected to join Escobar's rebellion, often taking their entire command with them, so that by the opening of hostilities Escobar was in command of nearly 30,000 men, including a large contingent of Yaqui fighters. After a ten-hour battle Monterrey was under rebel control. Escobar remained in the city just as long as it took to remove $345,000 from local banks and to ransack the home of General Juan Andreu Almazán. From there Escobar retired by way of Saltillo, Coahuila, tearing up railroad tracks as he went. Portes Gil moved quickly to crush Escobar's rebellion by putting Calles in command of federal military and naval forces, which consisted of about 72% of Mexico's original ground forces, in addition to the air force and some 5,000 agrarians from San Luis Potosí.

The beginning of the rebellion was set to coincide with the inauguration of U.S. president Herbert Hoover on March 4, 1929. Escobar hoped that if he could win a few battles and quickly take control of the government that he would receive recognition from Hoover's administration by default, as his foreign policies were not yet defined, but Hoover backed Portes Gil and the established constitution. This had a significant impact on the outcome of the rebellion, according to columnist Drew Pearson, who said that many of the garrisons that defected to join Escorbar's revolt soon deserted back to the federal government after learning of Hoover's decision.

Immediately after their capture of Monterrey, Escobar forces further up north moved to take control of the ports of entry along the Arizona-Sonora border, while further to the south Escobar forces under General Jesus M. Aguirre unsuccessfully attacked Veracruz. Rebels in Sinaloa won a significant victory at Mazatlán, where they inflicted "considerable punishment" on retreating government forces; and in Agua Prieta and Naco, the garrisons revolted to join the rebels, placing the customs collector and other officials in jail. At the same time a force of some 500 rebels occupied Nogales, Sonora, and succeeded in placing the customs collector, the immigration inspector, the postmaster and other officials under arrest. However, most of those arrested swore allegiance to Escobar and were allowed to return to work shortly thereafter. After successfully taking over the Arizona ports of entry, several border towns on the West Texas frontier quickly came under rebel control. By March 5, rebel forces were in command of Villa Acuña, Piedras Negras and Ojinaga, and moving to take control of Ciudad Juárez, Mexico's largest city on the international border and its greatest port of entry, opposite El Paso, Texas.

=== The Battle of Juárez ===
The Battle of Juárez began a couple of days later in the early morning hours of March 8. Rebel forces under the command of General Marcelino Murrieta quickly swept through the city, forcing the federal garrison back to positions along the Rio Grande, adjacent to the international border and thousands of American spectators who had formed up to watch the hostilities from the river's edge, windows and roof tops. Troopers of the 7th Cavalry were also present to protect American lives and prevent the fighting from spilling over to their side of the border. Several stray bullets landed on the American side, causing a few casualties, but nobody was killed. The thirteen-story El Paso bank building was struck so many times that the upper floors had to be evacuated for safety. After hours of heavy fighting along the international border, when it appeared as though the rebels would soon be victorious, the commander of the American forces in El Paso, General George Van Horn Moseley, crossed the line into Mexico to confer with the federal commander, General Matías Ramos, to ask about his intentions. General Ramos informed Moseley that he was willing to surrender the city, but only if the rebels guaranteed him and his men proper treatment as prisoners of war, or be allowed to cross into the United States for internment. The latter was agreed upon and by the end of the day some 300 Mexican Army officers and men, along with their wives and children, crossed the border for internment at Fort Bliss. The rebels were now in control of Mexico's most important port of entry, and they intended to use it as a source of weapons and war material and other supplies from the United States.

=== Air war ===
During the Escobar Rebellion, both the federal government and the Escobar rebels used aircraft in ways never before seen on the American continent. The air war began on the morning of March 16, 1929, when two federal airplanes dropped bombs on rebel troop trains at the railyard in Torreón and then on the military base just outside town. After the attack, General Escobar realized that he was at a major disadvantage without an air force of his own, so he immediately took steps to acquire aircraft from the United States and American mercenaries to pilot them. The federal government also looked to the United States for supplying aircraft and even hired an American combat veteran named Major Rayma L. Andrews to take command of their new squadron. Major Andrews was a veteran of World War I, where he served with the British Royal Flying Corps. After the war he continued his travels across Latin America, selling airplanes and demonstrating bombing techniques. When the Escobar Rebellion broke out, Andrews offered his services to the Mexican government, which signed a contract with him and tasked him with acquiring new aircraft from the United States, which would be paid for by the Mexican government via depositing money into an account at the El Paso National Bank. Andrews purchased a wide variety of civilian model biplanes, including Travel Airs, Eaglerocks, and Steamermans, and later in the conflict he flew some of the Vought "Corsair" warplanes purchased by the Mexican government in February 1929.

On the rebel side, General Escobar hired a number of American pilots for $1,000 a week, including Art J. Smith, Pete Stanley, Jack O'Brien, Patrick Murphy and Robert H. Polk, one of two professional revolution followers who made a career of "revolution hopping" across Latin America. Later on these five men were joined by Phil Mohun, another experienced combat veteran that deserted the federal air force to join the revolution and who would eventually emerge as a key member of the rebel air force, which was aptly named the "Yankee Doodle Escadrille". Overall command of the Yankee Doodle Escadrille was given to General Gustavo Salinas, a cultured man who was educated and learned to fly in the United States and who was a veteran of some of the other the Mexican revolutions of the 1920s. The rebel air force consisted of just ten aircraft, all civilian types converted for military use, except for one captured "Corsair". Most were purchased in Arizona and illegally flown into Mexico from airports in Tucson and Phoenix, Arizona. Relying on small arms like the Thompson sub-machine gun and improvised bombs for armaments, the Yankee Doodle Escadrille was ill-suited for all combat roles, but would unhesitatingly attack federal aircraft or bomb enemy troop concentrations, scoring a few victories.

One of the first major engagements involving the Yankee Doodle Escadrille was the Battle of Jiménez, which began on March 30 and ended five days later when federal forces took control of the area. During the fighting, seven rebel aircraft faced an unknown number of federal "Corsair" biplanes, resulting in the loss of two rebel aircraft and the capture of a "Corsair" from the federals. The capture of the "Corsair" occurred when Lieutenant Colonel Roberto Fierro approached the rebel lines at Jiménez to drop a few bombs and some propaganda leaflets, which urged the rebels to give up. As Fierro approached the city, Phil Mohun and Robert Polk took off in their vintage biplanes to challenge the enemy. Just as Mohun moved in to open fire, rebel ground forces opened up as well. One bullet struck the plane's carburetor, forcing Fierro to make a sudden emergency landing in enemy territory. Taking the machine gun, Fierro and his observer, a Lieutenant Valle, set off into the surrounding hills, just ahead of a unit of rebel cavalry sent after them. Mohun took credit for the victory and he repaired the captured "Corsair" for his own use.

In another engagement, Polk was hit in the face by a bullet and severely damaged his aircraft while attempting to make an emergency landing. Later on, Mohun's plane was "riddled" by machine-gun fire from a "Corsair", forcing him to make a hazardous crash landing, as he was flying without a parachute. The battle eventually turned for the federals when Lt. Col. Fierro dropped bombs on a rebel train car filled with dynamite. The resulting explosion was massive and sent the rebels into a disorderly retreat. Hundreds were subsequently cut down by federal cavalrymen as they tried to escape the slaughter.

The Yankee Doodle Escadrille served in all theaters of the conflict, although newspapers indicate that it scored its greatest success in Sonora, during the battles for the ports of entry. During the siege of Naco, beginning on March 31, a rebel plane allegedly flown by the Irish pilot Patrick Murphy scored two direct hits on federal trenches, killing at least two soldiers, according to a newspaper. Murphy also managed to drop several bombs on the American side of the border, causing a significant amount of damage and a few injuries, as well as making history by committing the first ever aerial bombardment of United States territory. Murphy was eventually shot down by federal ground fire, but he somehow escaped into Arizona. In all, over 100 bombs were dropped by rebel pilots during the battle for Naco, although casualties from these attacks were relatively light.

In another engagement on April 4, a federal airplane out bombing rebel positions was shot down by enemy ground fire a few miles south of Naco. Both the aviator and the bomb dropper were killed, and their charred bodies were brought into town under a flag of truce. Out of respect for the dead, General Fausto Topete announced that his pilots would not bomb Naco that evening. Sometime after that, Major Andrews attacked a rebel troop concentration outside of Naco with two 100-pound bombs. When the rebels saw the enemy plane, they ran to take cover underneath the overhanging banks of a dry river, creating the perfect target of men and animals for Andrews. Dropping both of his bombs, Andrews circled around and through the columns of dust he counted eight dead officers along with several enlisted men and their horses.

=== Surrender at Nogales ===
Following Escobar's defeat in the Battle of Jiménez, the revolutionary fervor which had taken hold of the country was diminishing and his troops were now deserting in large numbers. Leading his remaining units north into Sonora, he intended to hold out for as long as he could. Government forces under Calles rapidly took control of the cities left in Escobar's wake until finally arriving at Nogales, the rebels' last major stronghold. On the morning of April 30, three federal airplanes dropped twelve bombs over the city. There were no casualties reported, but the sound of the explosions and the return fire from rebel ground forces was enough to cause thousands of Mexicans to flee to the American side of the border for protection. The exodus continued until 3:00 PM, by which time as many as 10,000 Mexican refugees had crossed into Arizona. Fear of additional airstrikes and the realization that the war was lost prompted many of the rebel officers to consider surrendering to the federals or fleeing into the United States, to avoid punishment by the Mexican government. At noon that day, the commander of American forces at Fort Huachuca, General Frank S. Cocheu, met with a group of rebel officers at the border in Nogales to negotiate the terms of surrender. The rebels agreed to surrender Nogales, Sonora, but only if the Mexican government promised not to execute or otherwise molest any of the rebel soldiers, and give them food and back pay. All of the conditions were agreed upon, and by the end of the day Nogales was under the control of the government forces of General Lucas González.

With the rebellion at an end, General Escobar boarded a plane and flew it into Arizona, where he asked for and received asylum from the American authorities. When asked about his defeat, Escobar blamed the lack of supplies, munitions and support from the United States government. On March 3, 1930, a grand jury in Tucson, Arizona, filed a seven-count suit against Escobar, several of his generals, and members of the Yankee Doodle Escadrille, for "unlawfully exporting arms and munitions of war from the United States to Mexico", but the case was later dismissed on May 25, 1932. Escobar remained in exile in Canada for the next several years until 1942, shortly after the American entrance into World War II, when he returned to Mexico to offer his services to President Lázaro Cárdenas. By 1952 he had achieved the rank of major general in the Mexican Army and was active in politics. He died in Mexico City in 1969.

== Image gallery ==
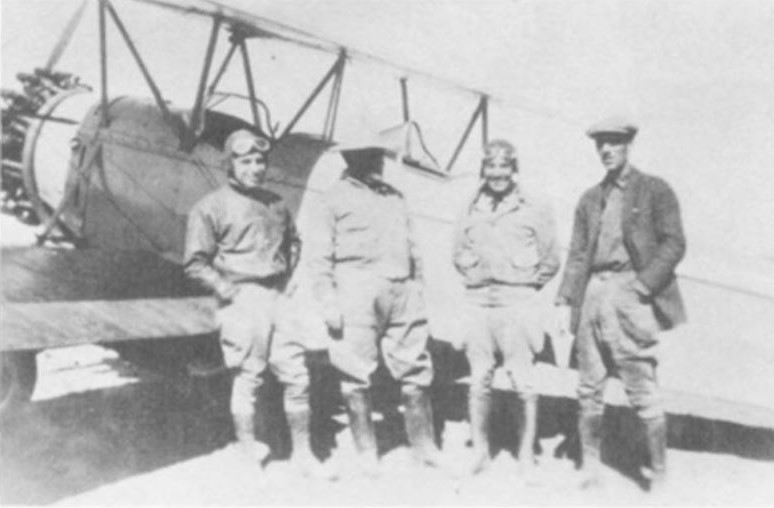
Major Rayma L. Andrews (far right), a Mexican colonel and two pilots wearing goggles during the siege of Naco, Sonora, on April 4, 1929. Both of the pilots were shot down and killed on the following day.

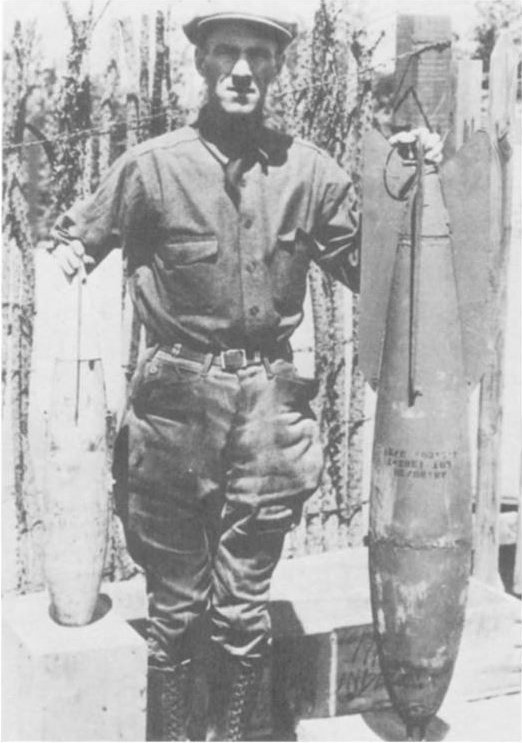
Major Andrews stands with a 25-pound fragmentation bomb and a 100-pound demolition bomb.

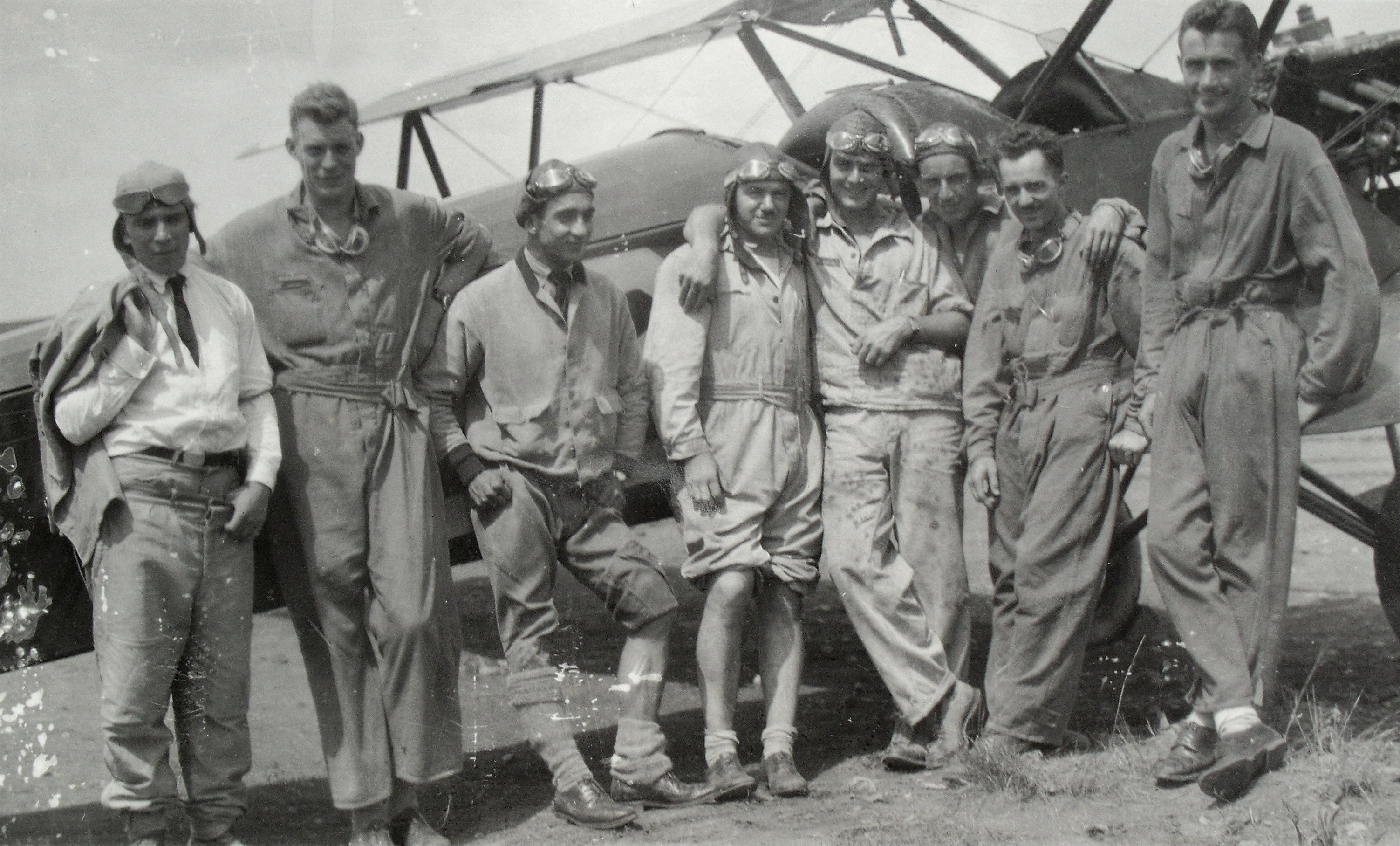
Mexican pilots in the 1920s, including Lt. Col. Roberto Fierro seventh from left

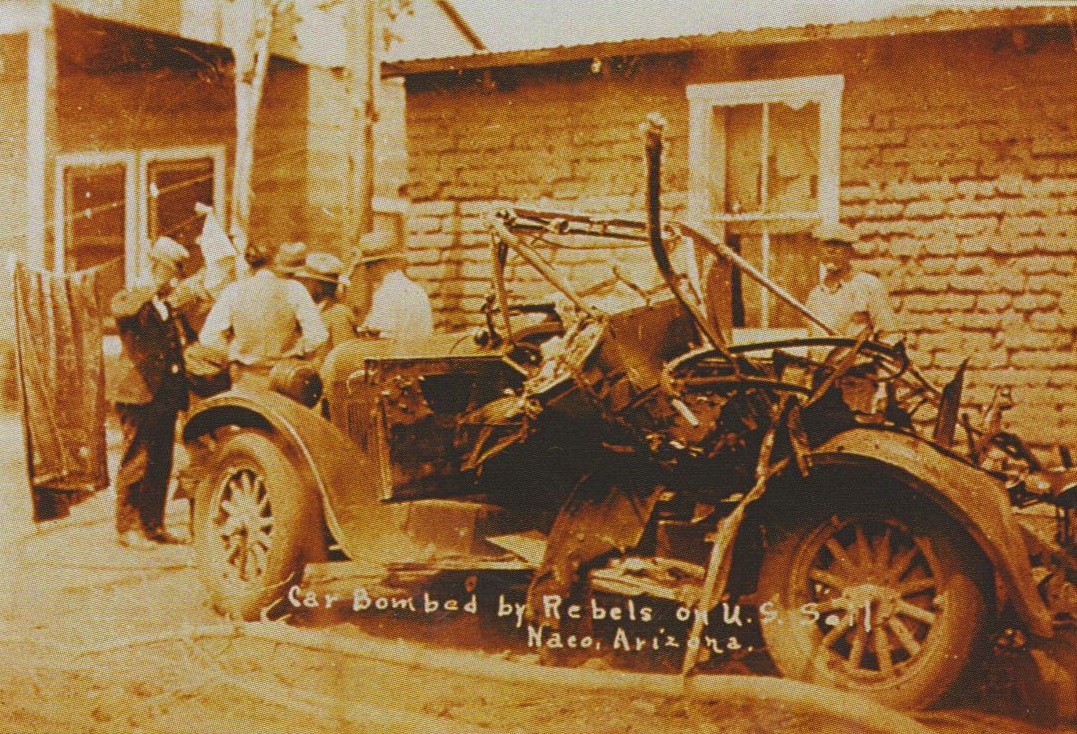
A Dodge touring car destroyed during the bombing of Naco, Arizona

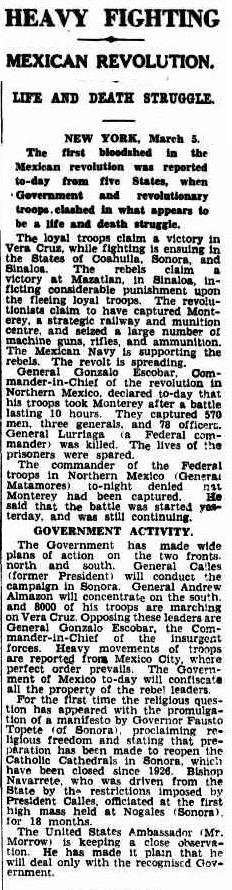
A newspaper clipping from the March 7, 1929, edition of "The Brisbane Courier" concerning the Escobar Rebellion

== See also ==
- Cristero War
- List of wars involving Mexico
- Military history of Mexico
