= Dolan Ellis =

American singer-songwriter, balladeer (born 1935)

- Born: Francis Dolan Ellis; March 1, 1935 (age 91); Kansas, US
- Occupations: politician, musician
- Known for: Official state balladeer for Arizona; Member of The New Christy Minstrels
- Website: https://dolanellis.com/

Francis Dolan Ellis (born March 1, 1935, in Kansas) is an American singer-songwriter who has been Arizona's Official State Balladeer since 1966, as appointed by ten consecutive governors. Governor Sam Goddard made the first appointment. Since then, official balladeers have been appointed in other states.

In his role as Balladeer, Dolan has written more than 300 songs and performed them throughout the state and in most U.S. states, as well as in twenty foreign countries. As a musician, Ellis is known for his 12-string guitar, his baritone voice, the songs he writes, and his unique arrangements of other songs. He specializes in songs of Arizona and the American Southwest, but often goes back to his roots as a jazz musician. Dolan pioneered the use of large-screen photography to illustrate his songs.

He was an original member of The New Christy Minstrels and was with them for their first five albums, several gold records, their Grammy in 1963 for Best Group, major concert appearances, and a full season (1962–1963) as regulars on the nationally televised Andy Williams Show.

In 1996, Ellis founded the Arizona Folklore Preserve, located in Ramsey Canyon in the Huachuca Mountains. Operated by the University of Arizona-South, the Preserve features guest artists on most weekends and monthly performances by Ellis himself.

In 2014, Ellis was featured in the documentary film Wall Of Dreamers.

== See also ==
- The Bombing of Naco, a folksong written by Ellis about the 1929 bombing of Naco by Irish mercenary Patrick Murphy
