= Brookings-Harbor High School =

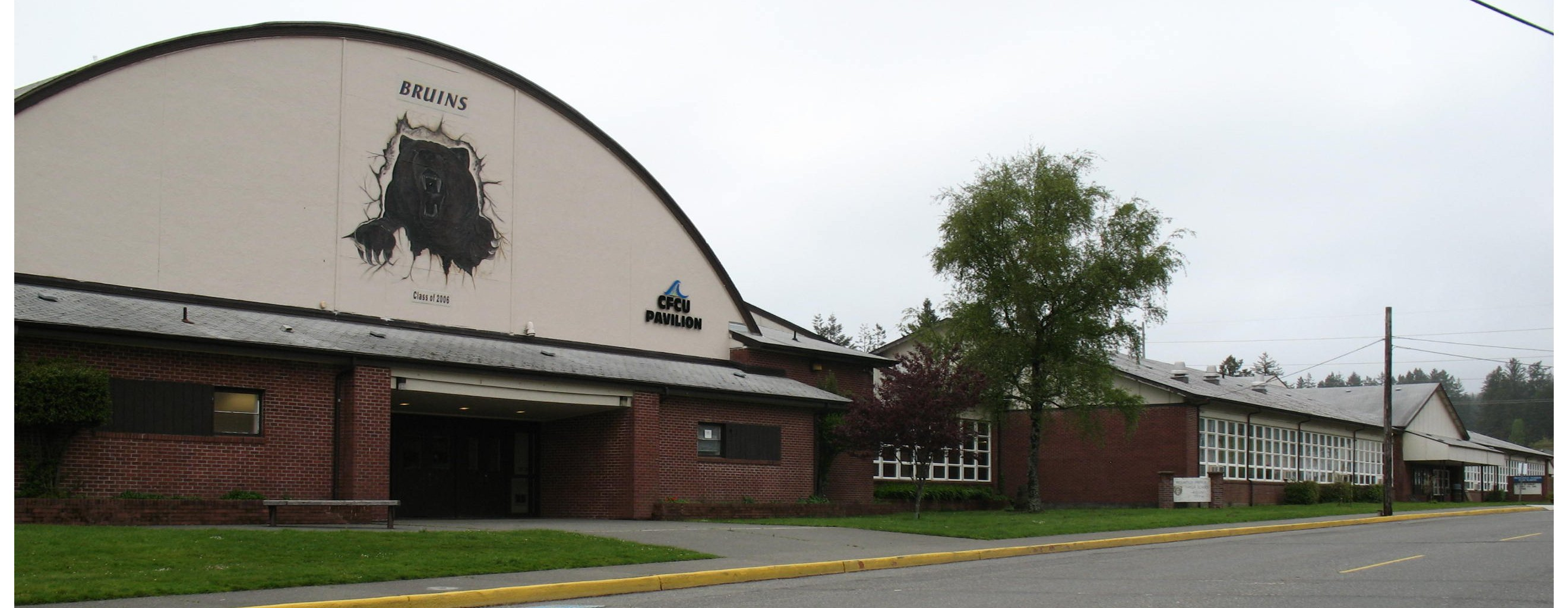

Location
- 625 Pioneer; Brookings, Curry, Oregon 97415; United States; 42°03′26″N 124°16′49″W

Information
- Type: Public
- School district: Brookings-Harbor School District
- Principal: DeAnne Varitek
- Teaching staff: 20.42 (FTE)
- Grades: 9-12
- Enrollment: 445 (2023–2024)
- Student to teacher ratio: 21.79
- Colors: Navy blue and gold
- Athletics conference: OSAA 3A-5 Far West League
- Mascot: Bruin
- Rival: Gold Beach High School
- Website: www.brookings.k12.or.us/highschool

Brookings-Harbor High School (BHHS) is a public high school located in Brookings, Oregon, United States.

== Attendance ==
Brookings-Harbor High School serves the city of Brookings and the surrounding area, including the community of Harbor. The school's attendance as of 2013 is approximately 550 students. The school has experienced steady declining enrollment for several years.

== Academics ==
In 2014, 90% of the school's seniors received their high school diploma. Of 162 students, 145 graduated, 5 dropped out, 2 received a modified diploma, and 8 went on to receive higher education. The school is ranked in the 15th percentile among Oregon high schools and is below average.

== Athletics ==
=== State championships ===
Boys Baseball 2020-2021
