= José Gonzalo Escobar =

Mexican military officer

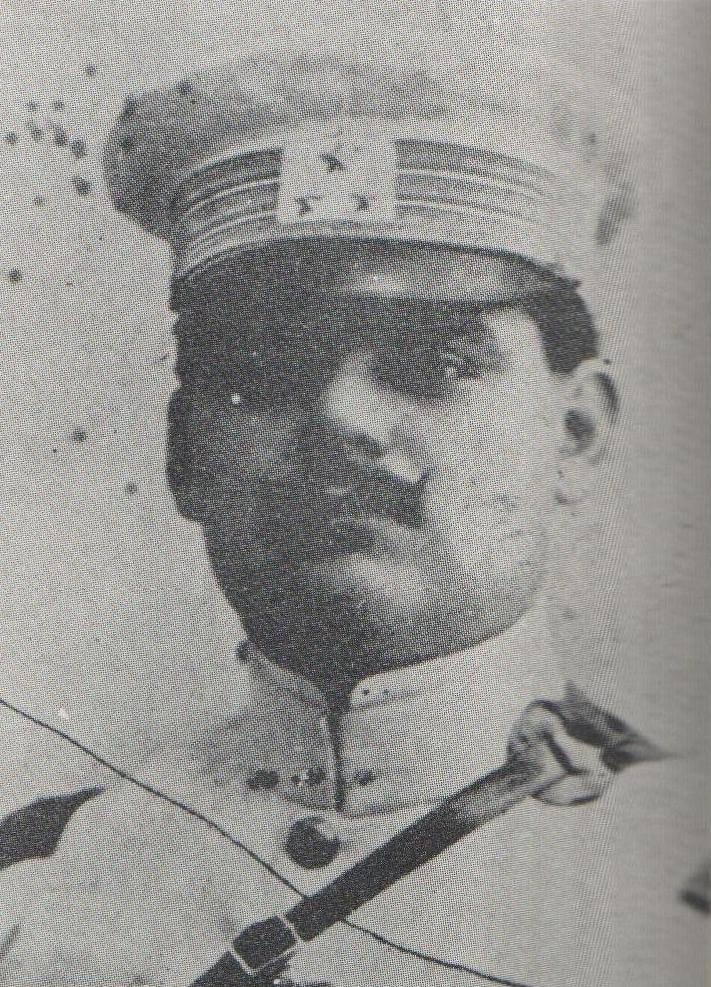
- Born: 31 January 1892; Mazatlán, Sinaloa, Mexico
- Died: 16 December 1969 (aged 77); Federal District, Mexico
- Military career
- Allegiance: Mexico
- Branch: Mexican Army
- Service years: 1913–1952?
- Rank: Major General
- Conflicts: Mexican Revolution; Huerta Rebellion; Gómez-Serrano Revolt; Escobar Rebellion
- Other work: Politician

General José Gonzalo Escobar Beltrán (Note: In this Mexican name, the surname is Escobar and the second or maternal family name is Beltrán.) (31 January 1892 – 16 December 1969) was an officer in the Mexican Army and leader of the failed Escobar Rebellion in 1929, which challenged the political power of Plutarco Elías Calles.

== Military career ==
Escobar was born in Mazatlán, Sinaloa, in 1892. During the Mexican Revolution in 1913, he joined the army of Venustiano Carranza and fought in the campaigns against Pancho Villa in 1914 and 1915. He later was in command of the federal cavalry in their famous charge that defeated Villa's forces one last time in the 1919 Battle of Ciudad Juárez. Described as "brave, young and dashing", Escobar became one of the most popular officers in the Mexican Army, following his victories in the "Shelf of Death" battle during Adolfo de la Huerta's rebellion of 1924 and the Gómez-Serrano Revolt of 1927.

In 1929, Escobar launched his own rebellion to oust jefe máximo Plutarco Elías Calles and Emilio Portes Gil, and establish himself as President of Mexico. After winning a few battles early on and the support of thousands of followers, Escobar's forces suffered a disastrous defeat in the Battle of Jiménez on 3 April 1929, and were gradually pushed back to the point of surrender by the government forces under Calles. Following the surrender of Nogales, Sonora, the last major rebel stronghold, Escobar escaped into the United States and lived in exile in Canada for many years.

Shortly after the American entrance into World War II, in early 1942 Escobar returned to Mexico by way of El Paso, Texas, and offered his services to President Lázaro Cárdenas. By 1952 Escobar had achieved the rank of Major General and was active in politics. He died in Mexico City in 1969.

== See also ==
- Military history of Mexico
- Cristero War
