= Alberto J. Pani =

Mexican politician

Pani in 1916

Alberto José Pani Arteaga (12 June 1878 – 25 August 1955) was a prominent politician, Mexican civil engineer, and expert in economic policy, who during the post-revolutionary period held various positions. Among these were Secretary of Industry, Commerce and Labor; Secretary of Finance and Public Credit; Secretary of Foreign Affairs, as ambassador of Mexico in France and in Spain. Pani is considered the author of the modern Mexican financial system.

== Early life and career ==
His parents were Julio Pani and Paz Arteaga, a prominent family in Aguascalientes. His first studies were at the Scientific and Literary Institute of Aguascalientes, later he moved to Mexico City to study at the National School of Engineering, graduating in 1902. He subsequently taught there and he joined an antireeleccionists group, supporting the presidential campaign of Francisco I. Madero. In 1911 he was appointed undersecretary of Public Instruction and Fine Arts. After Madero’s overthrow in February 1913, he opposed the dictatorship of Victoriano Huerta, and offered his services to the Constitutionalist faction headed by Venustiano Carranza, which subsequently was victorious in 1915.

== Government service ==
In 1917 when Carranza was elected president of Mexico, he appointed Pani as head of the Ministry of Industry, Commerce and Labor, and then sent to France as a special envoy during the peace talks resulting in the Treaty of Versailles in 1918. While Pani was in Europe, the 1920 rebellion by Sonoran revolutionary generals against Carranza, under the Plan of Agua Prieta, broke out. Pani returned to Mexico and following the election of Álvaro Obregón as president in 1920, he appointed Pani Secretary of Foreign Affairs in 1921. In 1923 he became the Secretary of the Treasury and Public Credit in 1923, a position in which ratified by President Plutarco Elías Calles in 1925.

For Pani, years between 1923 and 1927 were the apex of his career in government. He oversaw the reorganization of government finance, the re-negotiation of the external debt, and the construction of a single bank under government control, the Banco de México. His was a program of classical liberalism, "a balanced budget, the restoration of foreign confidence in Mexico's ability to pay debts, and a stable currency." Under Pani, Mexico imposed an income tax, cut salaries of civil servants, and streamlined government by abolishing departments in various ministries. His efforts resulted in greater revenues for government, exceeding expenditures. He strengthened the financial sector for rural areas through the National Bank of Agricultural Credit. His policies resulted in the construction of new infrastructure such as roads, irrigation systems, and major hydraulic works. Pani left the post of Secretary of the Treasury in 1927 and returned to Europe, where he was minister plenipotentiary in France, then Mexican Ambassador to the Spanish Republic. He returned to Mexico during the period when Calles was the power behind the presidency, a period known as the Maximato (1928–34) to serve as Secretary of the Treasury in 1932 in the government of Abelardo L. Rodríguez (1932–34).

== Private life and entrepreneurship ==
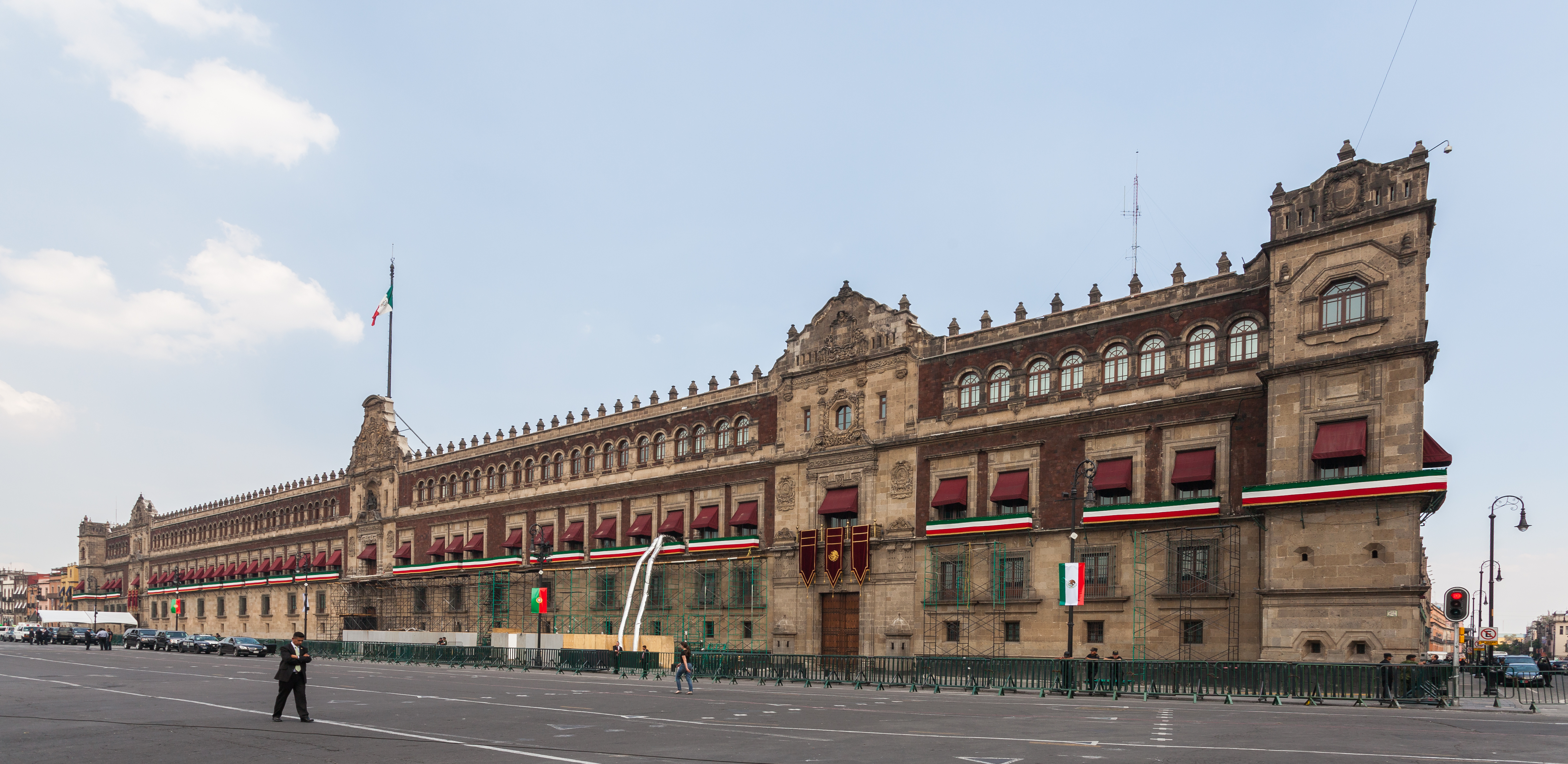
National Palace, Mexico, showing the third floor addition by Pani

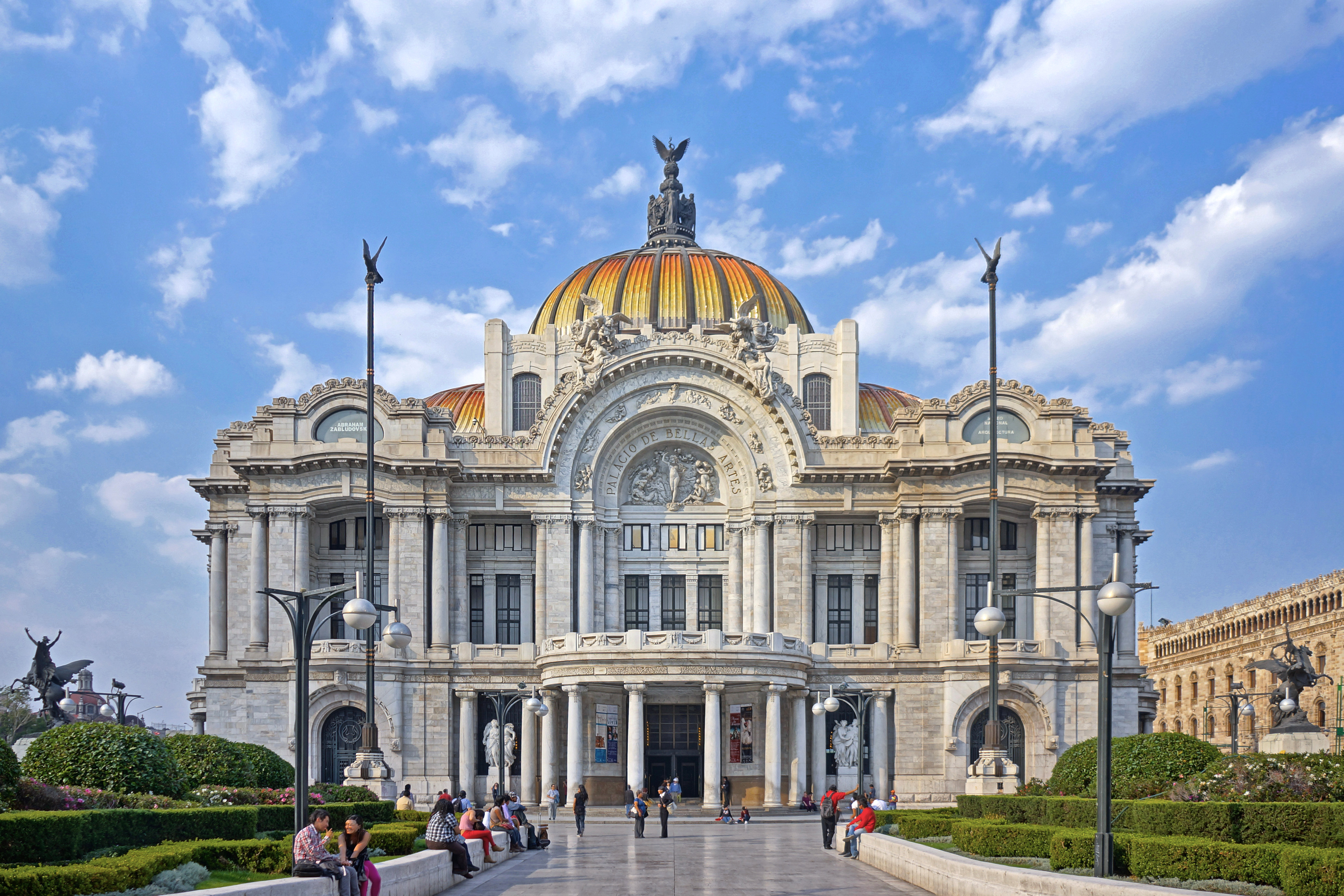
Palacio de Bellas Artes

After leaving government service, Pani pursued architectural projects in Mexico City with his construction firm and his architect nephew, Mario Pani. Projects included the redesign of the zócalo or Plaza de la Constitución, the National Palace, which dated to the early colonial era, adding a third floor, and the project to finish the Palace of Fine Arts, begun under Porfirio Díaz and suspended during the Mexican Revolution.

== Works ==
Pani was a prolific author and published a wide range of works, including autobiographical ones.

- Hygiene in Mexico: A Study in Sanitary and Educational Problems. New York: G.P. Putnam’s Sons (1916)
- On the road to democracy (1918)
- La cuestión internacional mexicano-americana durante el gobierno del Gral. Álvaro Obregón (1925)
- La política hacendaría y la revolución (1926)
- Mi contribución al Nuevo regimen, 1910-1933. (1933)
- Tres monografías.
- Decálogo del capitalista revolucionario
- Apuntes autobiográficos (1945), 2d ed. (1950)
- Alberto J. Pani: Ensayo biográfico. Mexico City: imprenta de Manuel Casas 1961.
