= Josefina Ortiz =

First Lady of Mexico

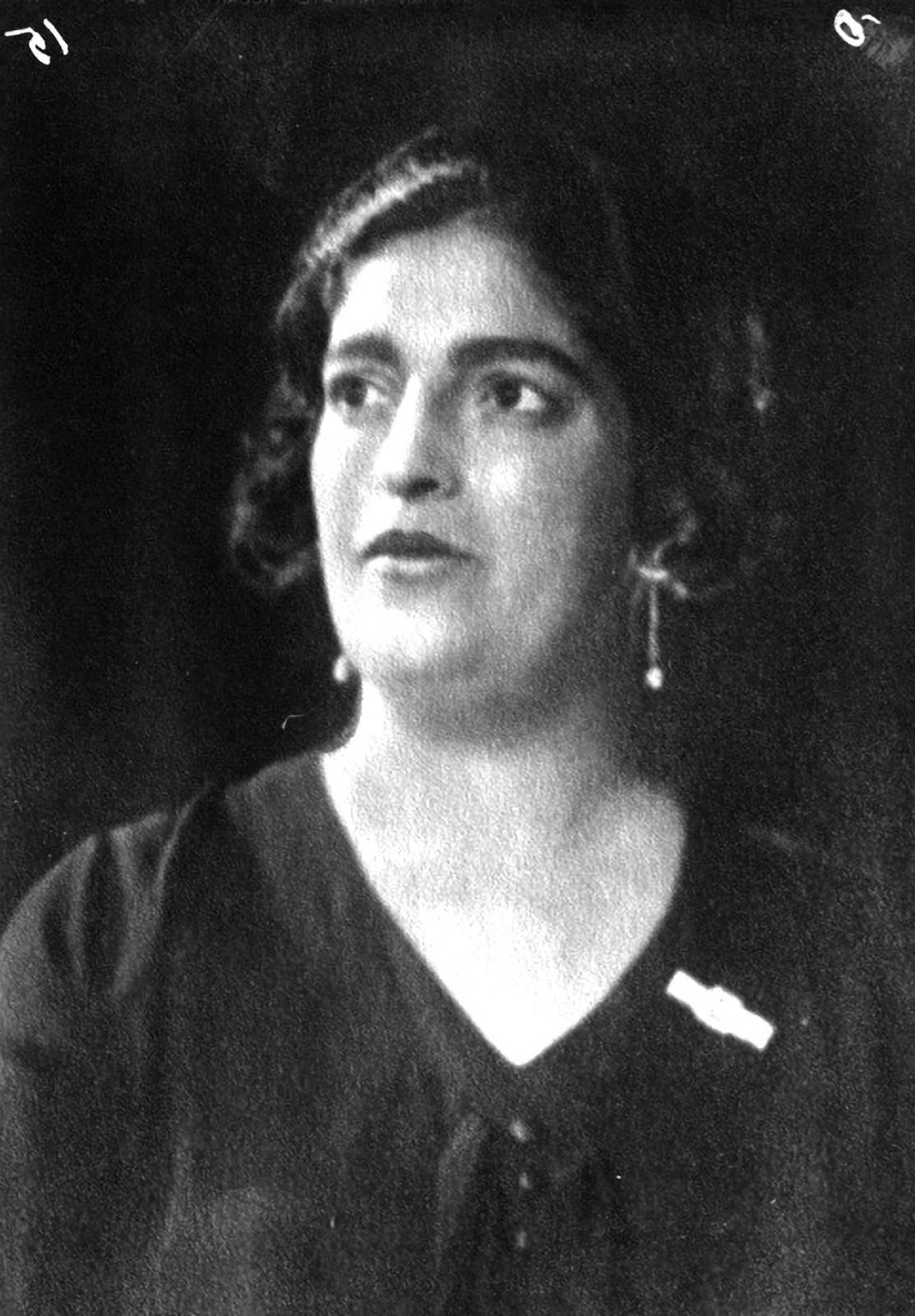
- Ortiz in 1930

First Lady of Mexico
- In office February 5, 1930 – September 2, 1932
- President: Pascual Ortiz Rubio
- Preceded by: Carmen García González
- Succeeded by: Aída Sullivan

Personal details
- Born: February 13, 1892 Copándaro, Michoacán, Mexico
- Died: July 18, 1983 (aged 91) Mexico City, Mexico
- Spouse: Pascual Ortiz Rubio (m. 1920; died 1963)

Josefina Ortiz y Ortiz (February 13, 1892 – July 18, 1983) was the First Lady of Mexico and the wife of the Mexican President Pascual Ortiz Rubio. During her time as first lady she started initiatives aiding indigenous children.

== Biography ==
Josefina Ortiz y Ortiz was born in 1892 on 13 February in Copándaro, Michoacán as the third of four children in the family. She studied at the College of Teresian Nuns of Morelia.

In 1920, on 13 August, she married Ortiz Rubio, who later became president of Mexico in 1928 with an official mandate until 1934.

== First Lady ==
After Pascual Oritz Rubio became president in 1920, Josefina Ortiz y Ortiz accompanied him in different public events, both abroad and in Mexico. Both of them served the functions of ambassadors in trips to Brazil and Germany.

On 5 February 1930, her husband, the president was attacked and wounded, along with Josefina and his niece. This didn't dissuade the couple from appearing in public events. Josefina Ortiz continued her work on the "La Gota de Leche", assisting indigenous children.

In 1932, two years prior to the end of mandate, her husband Pascual Oritz Rubio resigned the presidency and both of them moved to the United States.

After her husband died, Josefina dedicated herself to taking care of her grandchildren and great-grandchildren until her death on 1983 at the age of 91.
