= Amalia Solórzano =

Mexican first lady

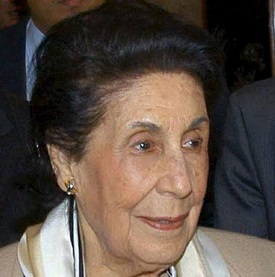

First Lady of Mexico
- In role December 1, 1934 – November 30, 1940
- President: Lázaro Cárdenas
- Preceded by: Aída Sullivan
- Succeeded by: Soledad Orozco

First Lady of Michoacan
- Governor: Lázaro Cárdenas

Personal details
- Born: Amalia Alejandra Solórzano Bravo; July 10, 1911 Tacámbaro, Michoacán, Mexico
- Died: December 12, 2008 (aged 97) Mexico City, Mexico
- Spouse: Lázaro Cárdenas (m. 1932; died 1970)
- Children: Cuauhtémoc Cárdenas

Amalia Alejandra Solórzano Bravo (July 10, 1911 – December 12, 2008) was the First Lady of Mexico from 1934 to 1940. She was the wife of president Lázaro Cárdenas, the mother of the thrice ex-presidential candidate and former Head of Government of the Federal District, Cuauhtémoc Cárdenas, and the grandmother of the former Governor of Michoacán, Lázaro Cárdenas Batel.

== Biography ==
Solórzano was born in Tacámbaro to Cándido Solórzano Morales and Albertina Bravo Sosa. She was a leading member of the Aid Committee for Children of the Spanish People, an organization that helped children who were refugees in France due to the Spanish Civil War reach Mexico.

At the time of her death, she was the world's eldest surviving former First Lady, living 74 years after occupying the post on December 1, 1934. She was 23 years old when she became First Lady, which makes her the youngest one in Mexican history.

== Orders, awards and recognitions ==
- Order of Charles III, Grand Cross, awarded by the Spanish State Secretary for Iberoamerica at Spain's Embassy in Mexico City, on November 20, 2007.

== See also ==
- List of first ladies of Mexico
- Politics of Mexico

Honorary titles
Preceded by Aída Sullivan	First Lady of Mexico; 1934–1940	Succeeded by Soledad Orozco
