= Joaquín Amaro =

Mexican politician

Joaquín Amaro Domínguez
- General De Division Del Ejercito Mexicano
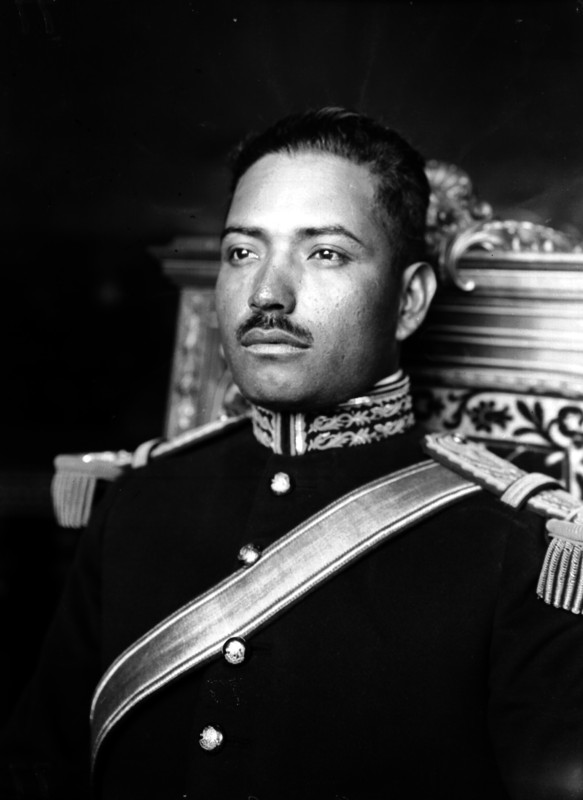

t [[Secretary of War and Navy]] General De Division Del Ejercito Mexicano
- In office 1 December 1924 – 2 March 1929
- President: Plutarco Elías Calles; Emilio Portes Gil
- Preceded by: Francisco R. Serrano
- Succeeded by: Plutarco Elías Calles
- In office 16 May 1929 – 15 October 1931
- President: Emilio Portes Gil; Pascual Ortiz Rubio
- Preceded by: Plutarco Elías Calles
- Succeeded by: Plutarco Elías Calles

Personal details
- Born: August 16, 1889 Corrales de Abrego, Sombrerete, Zacatecas, Mexico
- Died: March 15, 1952 (aged 62)
- Occupation: Secretary of War, Military reformer, Military educational reformer, Publisher
- Awards: Cruz de Segunda Clase
- Nickname: El Indio

Military service
- Allegiance: Mexico
- Branch/service: Mexican Army
- Years of service: 1911–1939; 1942–1945
- Rank: General de división
- Battles/wars: Mexican Revolution; Battle of Celaya; Battle of Ocotlán; Cristero War; World War II

Joaquín Amaro Domínguez (August 16, 1889 – March 15, 1952) was a Mexican revolutionary general and military reformer. He served as Secretary of War in the cabinets of Presidents Plutarco Elías Calles, Emilio Portes Gil, and Pascual Ortiz Rubio, making him one of the longest-serving cabinet-level officials in Mexican history. His ambitious reforms of the fractious Mexican military transformed the armed forces from a political partisan to an armed force loyal to the president and government. He accomplished this "through a process of cultural reeducation that replaced an entrenched tradition of militarism with one emphasizing such values as discipline, duty, honor, and loyalty to the civilian government."

== Early life ==
Amaro was born in Corrales de Abrego in the municipality of Sombrerete, Zacatecas, the first of Antonio Amaro and Angela Domínguez's ten children. His family was of Indigenous ancestry, although they were probably not Yaqui, as was widely assumed. While Amaro was still a child, the family moved to the nearby state of Durango, where his father worked on an hacienda. He learned to read and write, although probably without the benefit of formal schooling. Beginning in 1908, he worked in the office of the Saucillo hacienda where his father was employed, assisting with bookkeeping. With two incomes, the family was able to enjoy a comfortable existence. In 1910, his father sold his possessions and gave the money to his eldest son, advising him, "go to Durango with your mother and siblings, work for Mr. Calderón [a local store-owner], learn the business, get to know the town, and when you feel able, open your own store." His father left for Torreón in November of that year, and although Amaro never saw him again, he read about his exploits with the revolutionary army of Colonel Luis Moya. Joaquín Amaro Domínguez married Elisa Izaguirre Jurado on September 3, 1921, in Saltillo, Coahuila, Mexico. Together, they built a large family, becoming the parents of at nine children six sons and three daughters.

== Military career ==
=== Early Revolution ===
On February 28, 1911, Amaro enlisted in the Maderist army of General Domingo Arrieta. Shortly after Amaro enlisted, his father was killed in battle. After five months as a private, he was promoted every subsequent month, attaining the rank of lieutenant by December.

As part of the army of Colonel Gertrudis G. Sánchez, whose forces Arrieta's had joined, Amaro fought against the Zapatistas in Morelos, engaging them at least nineteen times. In one of these engagements, the battle of Jojutla de Juárez, he earned the "Cruz de Segunda Clase," a heroism medal. From 1913 to 1914, he fought the federal troops under the command of Victoriano Huerta, continuing all the while to rise in rank. By 1914 he had risen to the rank of general.

It was under the command of General Sánchez that Amaro developed the reputation of a fierce warrior. It was rumored that he wore an earring and used the battlecry "Here is the man of the pendant earring! Here is the Indian!" He also supposedly emulated the fighting style of the Yaqui people. He also developed the reputation of a harsh disciplinarian who occasionally used his riding crop to mete out corporal punishments to his subordinates. He may have even shot men in his charge or employ for disobeying orders.

=== Conventionalists v. Constitutionalists ===
After the fall of Huerta, while still under the command of Sánchez, he briefly supported the conventionalist government of Eulalio Gutiérrez, before breaking with Sánchez to ally with the constitutionalist army of Venustiano Carranza. Shortly after Sánchez and Amaro joined the Constitutionalists, Sánchez ordered Amaro to attack a column of troops commanded by General Francisco Murguía, who, while also a Constitutionalists, was a rival of Sánchez. While initially successful, Murguía's troops eventually prevailed, and Murguía sought to have Amaro executed for treason, a charge he narrowly escaped. Rather than damaging the reputation of Amaro, however, the incident did more to isolate Sánchez, who Amaro abandoned. The split finally came in 1915, when Amaro advanced the troops under his command on the Villista División del Norte, leaving Sánchez in Michoacán. By this time, he had already professed allegiance to General Álvaro Obregón and the carrancista government.

In April 1915, he led his troops, known as the "Rayados" ("striped ones"—so-called because the only uniforms Obregón could provide were prison uniforms) to support Obregón's defeat of the villistas in the second Battle of Celaya. Following the battle, Obregón named him Comandante militar ("military commander") of the 5th Division of the Army of the Northwest, and he was charged of ridding Michoacán of villista influence. At the end of 1915, the area under his command was expanded to include Guanajuato and Querétaro.

In 1916, he again fought the zapatistas in Morelos and Guerrero. In 1917, he was placed under the command of Murguía, and led expeditions against the remaining villistas of Durango and Chihuahua.

=== Rebellion against Carranza ===
When Obregón proclaimed the Plan of Agua Prieta against Carranza in 1920, Amaro remained loyal to Obregón, and was rewarded with the rank of General de división, the highest military rank. He became chief military officer of the third military zone, which included the states of Coahuila, Nuevo León and San Luis Potosí. In this capacity, he undertook to professionalize the unorganized ranks under him, gaining experience that would later benefit his reorganization of the entire military.

He later became commander of the seventh military zone, which comprised Nuevo León. There he put down the July rebellion of Pablo González. When in 1922 political unrest threatened to destabilize Coahuila, Amaro positioned his troops to block the occupation of the state legislature and to protect the governor's palace. In 1923, he was sent to maintain order during Nuevo León's gubernatorial elections. Following a series of violent incidents, Amaro disarmed groups of rural fighters.

After the assassination of Pancho Villa in July 1923, Amaro was widely suspected as one of the planners of the operation. Today, most historians attribute Villa's death to a well planned conspiracy, most likely initiated by then Minister of War Plutarco Elías Calles, who ordered Amaro to give support to the assassins. Amaro was later instrumental in freeing Jesús Salas Barraza, the leader of the group of assassins, from jail.

Amaro never wavered from his support for Calles and Obregón, and he fully shared Calles' hatred of the clergy. Calles gave Amaro full support in continuing the latter's plan to reform the Mexican armed forces along anti-clerical and populist lines:

I have fought without rest [...] against clericalism, large landowners, the militarism of the ex-Federals, the Spanish, and in general all those that do not contribute to the

enrichment of our beloved homeland and the betterment of the working

class.

Despite these sentiments, neither Calles nor Amaro hesitated in taking action against the extreme left-wing. When José Guadalupe Rodríguez tried to organise "soldier soviets" on the Bolshevist pattern, he was promptly arrested and shot along with some of his soldiers. Moreover, when a peasant and labor bloc of the Communist International was formed under the artist Diego Rivera, it was forcibly disbanded. Many on the extreme left were sent to the Marias Islands penal colony.

=== Delahuertist rebellion ===
In 1923, Amaro's chief of staff José Álvarez learned of the plot between generals Enrique Estrada, Guadalupe Sánchez, and Fortunato Maycotte to overthrow Obregón. Álvarez immediately returned to Nuevo León and informed Amaro of the plot, who promptly related the information to Obregón. The conspirators drafted Adolfo de la Huerta, then-Minister of Finance, to run for president against Plutarco Elias Calles, Obregón's chosen successor. Facing a rebellion with armies in the North, South, and East, Obregón relied on loyal generals such as Amaro to block rebel access to resources and the northern border and to put down the insurrection. Amaro, aided by General Lázaro Cárdenas, battled Estrada's forces, defeating them in the decisive battle of Ocotlán. Three days after the battle, Amaro's troops occupied Guadalajara, where Estrada's operation had been based. The rebellion crushed, the 1924 Mexican election was carried out peacefully.

== Post-war career ==
Following the election of Calles, Amaro was appointed Undersecretary of War. Francisco Serrano having been sent to Europe on a diplomatic mission late in Obregón's presidency, the Secretariat was unfilled. Calles may have been waiting to secure the support of generals Eugenio Martínez and Arnulfo Gómez, who were also potential candidates for the post. While undersecretary, Amaro initiated a series of legal reforms to purge the armed forces of "the germ of immorality and corruption." After an initial convention of important military figures, the Commission for Studies and Reforms of Military Laws and Regulations was formed. Ten months later, four new laws were promulgated.

=== Amaro's four laws ===
The first, the Law of Discipline, was divided into three sections: General Duties, Corrective Discipline, and Court of Honor. The first three articles of the General Duties defined military duty in terms of "self-sacrifice, loyalty, guardianship, and adherence to the law." The subsequent articles dealt with specific issues. One clarified the officer's duty to maintain order within his ranks; another prohibited soldiers from complaining about orders. One article prohibited servicemembers from interfering in politics. The final articles concerned decorum, and required subordinates to salute and give up their seats to superiors.

The Corrective Discipline section described the circumstances in which soldiers could be arrested for breaking the law, and required that such arrests be recorded in the offender's file.

The Court of Honor section was written for people who committed offenses that threatened the reputation of a unit or of the "dignity of the military." It established a system of courts martial to punish drunkenness, gambling, mismanagement of funds, and negligence. Punishments for those found guilty ranged from transfer to demotion to imprisonment.

The second law, the Law of Retirements and Pensions, allowed servicemembers who had given twenty to thirty-five years of service to retire at will. It also required retirement at a certain age that was dependent on rank. Finally, it provided for pensions for disabled servicemen and their families.

The third law, the Law of Promotions and Rewards, set up two distinct rubrics for promotion: one for peacetime and one for wartime. Peacetime promotions were tied directly to military education. Wartime promotions could be granted for heroic actions such as preventing enemy capture of artillery pieces, and could only be given by high-ranking officers. These promotions had to be approved by higher bodies. These reforms were an effort to end the practice of opportunistic and haphazard promotions which had inflated the number of generals in Mexico's officer corps during the Revolution.

The purpose of the fourth law, the Organic Law, was to organize the armed services. The first section sought to redefine the relationship between generals and the soldiers under them, demanding that all personnel be loyal to the nation and the constitution and take their orders from the President or his designees.

It further delineated the five military branches: high command, combat arms, auxiliary services, special corps, and for the first time, military education establishments, and specified the structures of each. It stratified servicemembers into three classifications: active, reserve, and retired. Another section of the law structured the navy.

=== Amaro as Secretary of War ===
Amaro was appointed Secretary of War by President Calles on December 1, 1924. Upon his appointment to the Secretariat, Amaro moved to Rancho de la Hormiga, a 40,468 square meter (ten acre) ranch that later became the presidential palace Los Pinos. There his children Guillermo, Manuel, and Elisa were born. He installed recreational facilities such as stables, polo fields, and tennis courts, as well as a military school at the ranch.

Prior to his appointment as Undersecretary of War, Amaro had laid plans for a Grand Military Academy of the Army. He made arrangements for the government to purchase to tracts of land, but the school never materialized. Rather, he focused his efforts on the Heroic Military Academy. Despite its excellent reputation, by the end of the Revolution, the college was in a state of disrepair. On September 30, 1925, Amaro shut it down for a major overhaul that took ten months. In addition to new facilities, it also boasted a new curriculum that emphasized civic and moral virtues. Admission requirements were put into place, and included letters of recommendation that could vouch for an applicant's moral character.

Amaro's efforts to reform the Mexican military and society extended beyond the realm of military education: he also founded publications that combatted the influence of the Catholic Church and of large landowners in the public consciousness. He had already founded two publications, Acción and El Agrarista, as well as publishing a tract entitled El Gato in the early 1920s. However, 1925 saw a large increase in the number of military journals published in Mexico. Those already in existence, such as the Revista del Ejército y de la Marina (Magazine of the Army and the Navy), took a new editorial stance under the direction of Professor Ignacio Richkarday, who Amaro had appointed editor, to moralize the army. While Revista was aimed at the officer corps, Amaro founded El Soldado, which emphasized the same themes, as a supplement for enlisted men. 1926 saw the founding of two more publications, Revista del Heróico Colegio Militar and Gladiador.

In 1927, Generals Francisco Serrano and Arnulfo Gómez conspired with General Eugenio Martínez to seize Calles, Obregón, and Amaro in hopes of igniting a rebellion against the reelection of Obregón. Martínez informed Calles of the plot before it could be enacted, and Serrano and Gómez were caught and executed.

Although Amaro sought to reform all branches of the Mexican military, he remained a political revolutionary general of the old school. As an army general, he understood little or nothing about aviation. He was slow to advance the progress of the Mexican Air Force, which had only three squadrons of obsolete aircraft during Amaro's tenure as Minister of War.

When President Obregón was assassinated by pro-clergy forces sixteen days after his 1928 re-election, many generals and other important figures in Mexican politics urged Amaro to run for the office. He always politely declined, stating that he had "never thought to dedicate [his] activities to politics." In February 1929, Amaro was injured during a game of fronton. He took a leave of absence from the Secretariat to seek medical attention at the Mayo Clinic in Rochester, Minnesota. During his three-month convalescence, which left him with a glass eye, Calles assumed the Secretariat, in which capacity he put down the Escobar rebellion against Emilio Portes Gil, who had been appointed interim president in the wake of Obregon's assassination.

Upon his return to Mexico and the Secretariat in May, he found a situation in which Calles was still attempting to control national politics from behind the scenes. Pascual Ortiz Rubio, Portes Gil's successor, was suspicious of Amaro, as was Calles. Calles, purporting to have received information that Amaro was planning on assassinating him or overthrowing Ortiz Rubio, informed the President of the alleged plot. Ortiz Rubio deferred to Calles to take care of the situation, and the Jefe Máximo met with three other cabinet officials, convincing them to resign so as to make it appear that the "cabinet crisis" did not center around Amaro. They agreed, and the following day, Calles, Amaro, and the other three secretarys met at Amaro's estate. There, all four cabinet ministers agreed to resign.

Amaro was succeeded by Calles, who appointed him director of the Heroic Military Academy.

=== Target of Rumors ===
Amaro's military reforms cut the Mexican military budget from one-third to one-quarter of the total Mexican government budget, and they resulted in the dismissal of numerous junior officers. The reforms, his involvement in suppressing leftists and the now-confirmed suspicion of his role in Pancho Villa's assassination, made Amaro very unpopular in some circles and a target of vicious, false rumors. One example is the tale that Amaro sent Captain Emilio Carranza a telegram ordering Carranza on July 13, 1928, to begin immediately a non-stop flight from New York City to Mexico City, which ended with the captain's fatal crash in the New Jersey Pine Barrens. However, contemporary news reports in the Evening Courier, Camden, NJ and New York Times show the story of the "fateful telegram" to be a fabrication.

Another example is the story that Amaro shot and killed a groom whom disobeyed his order to walk his polo pony and instead rode it to the stables, which the U.S. Ambassador to Mexico and his military attache passed to the Department of State. However, there is good reason to believe that Ambassabor James R. Sheffield loathed the Mexican Revolutionary leaders and would have passed on any rumor to discredit them regardless of its veracity. He used racial stereotypes to describe them, calling Calles "an Armenian and Indian" and "Amaro, Secretary of War, a pure blooded Indian and very cruel."

=== Later career ===
Amaro sought to create a Superior War College along the lines of France's École Supérieure de Guerre to train an elite group of officers. To this end he sent a number of generals to study the militaries and military academies of European and South American states. Amaro led the Heroic Military Academy from 1931 until 1935, and directed military education for the Secretariat of War from 1931 to 1936. He retired from active service on 16 August 1939.

In October 1942, during World War II, Amaro was reintegrated into the army, where he was responsible for defending the region of the Isthmus of Tehuantepec from Axis aggressions.

== Legacy ==
Amaro died in 1952 and was buried in the Panteón Francés de la Piedad. In 1966, his body was exhumed and reburied in Panteón Francés de San Joaquín. In the 1960s, a statue of Amaro on horseback was erected in Mexico City's Chapultepec Park.

== Offices ==
Government offices
Preceded by Francisco R. Serrano	Secretary of National Defense; 1924—1931	Succeeded by Plutarco Elías Calles
Military offices
Preceded by Gilberto R. Limón	Director of the Heroic Military Academy; 1931–1935	Succeeded by Rafael Cházaro Pérez
