= Aída Sullivan =

Aída Sullivan Coya
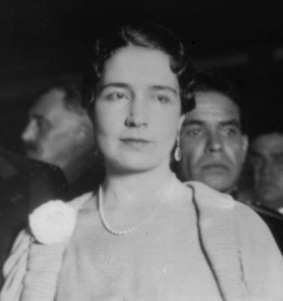

First Lady of Sonora
- In office September 13, 1943 – April 15, 1948
- Governor: Abelardo L. Rodríguez

First Lady of Mexico
- In office September 4, 1932 – November 30, 1934
- President: Abelardo L. Rodríguez
- Preceded by: Josefina Ortiz
- Succeeded by: Amalia Solórzano

Personal details
- Born: Aída Sullivan Coya; April 23, 1904 Puebla, Puebla state, Mexico
- Died: August 17, 1975 (aged 71) Mexico City, Mexico
- Spouse: Abelardo L. Rodríguez (m. 1924; died 1967)
- Children: Juan Abelardo; Fernando Julio; Abelardo

Aída Sullivan Coya, also known as Aída Sullivan de Rodríguez, (April 23, 1904 – August 17, 1975) was the First Lady of Mexico from 1932 to 1934, as well as the First Lady of the state of Sonora between 1943 and 1948. Sullivan was the third wife of Mexican President Abelardo L. Rodríguez.

== Biography ==
=== Early life and marriage ===
Aida Sullivan was born in the city of Puebla. She was one of three daughters - Emma, Enriqueta, and herself - of John Sullivan, an American engineer who worked in railroad construction, and his wife, María Coya Becalle, who was originally from Cienfuegos, Cuba. When her father died, Sullivan's mother married Julio Viderique Celis, the son of José Julio Anselmo de la Trinidad Viderique y Ureña and María del Refugio Cadislao Celis y Escobar. The couple had three more daughters (who were Aida Sullivan's stepsisters ): María Amparo, Elvira and Alma Julia Viderique Coya.

Sullivan met the then-Governor of Baja California Territory, Abelardo L. Rodriguez, while in the territory. The couple were married in Mexicali on February 6, 1924. He was thirty-four years old at the time, while she was nineteen years old. It was Sullivan's first marriage and Rodriguez's third marriage. The couple had three children: Juan Abelardo, Fernando Julio and Abelardo.

=== First lady of Mexico ===
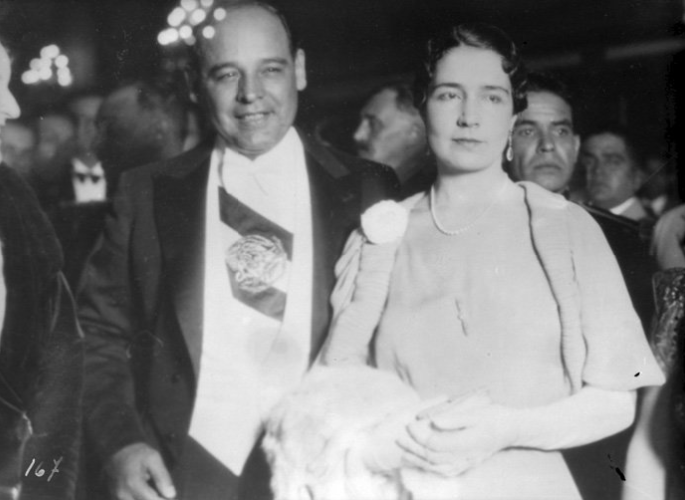
Aída Sullivan with her husband, Abelardo L. Rodríguez.

During her tenure as first lady, Sullivan accompanied her husband on official appearances and his trips around the world. She also took care of his health, as Rodríguez suffered from diabetes.

Sullivan continued the traditions of her predecessors. She focused on charitable work and organized the receptions and social activities of the presidency. Sullivan also championed two causes herself: the adoption of the Flag of the Americas in Mexico and the introduction of modern childcare practices in the country.

In 1933, concerned about the country's high infant mortality rate, Sullivan wrote Libro para la madre mexicana (Book For The Mexican Mother), in which she urged women to adopt new hygienic and nutritional measures to improve the quality of life for their children.

=== Later life ===
To escape from politics, the Rodriguez family settled in London for more than a year. In the 1940s, Abelardo L. Rodríguez became Governor of Sonora from 1943 to 1948. Aida Sullivan, as Sonora's first lady, established the Fundación Esposos Rodríguez, to grant scholarships to low-income students.

In 1964, Sullivan's and Rodriguez's eldest son, Juan Abelardo, and their daughter-in-law, Janine Ratliff died in a plane crash. The couple had four young children, whom Sullivan and Rodríguez took into their care.

Former President Abelardo L. Rodríguez died at the Scripps Clinic in La Jolla, California, in 1967. Sullivan died eight years later in 1975 at her home in Mexico City. Aida Sullivan was buried at El Sauzal in Ensenada, Baja California.
