= Carmen García González =

First Lady of Mexico

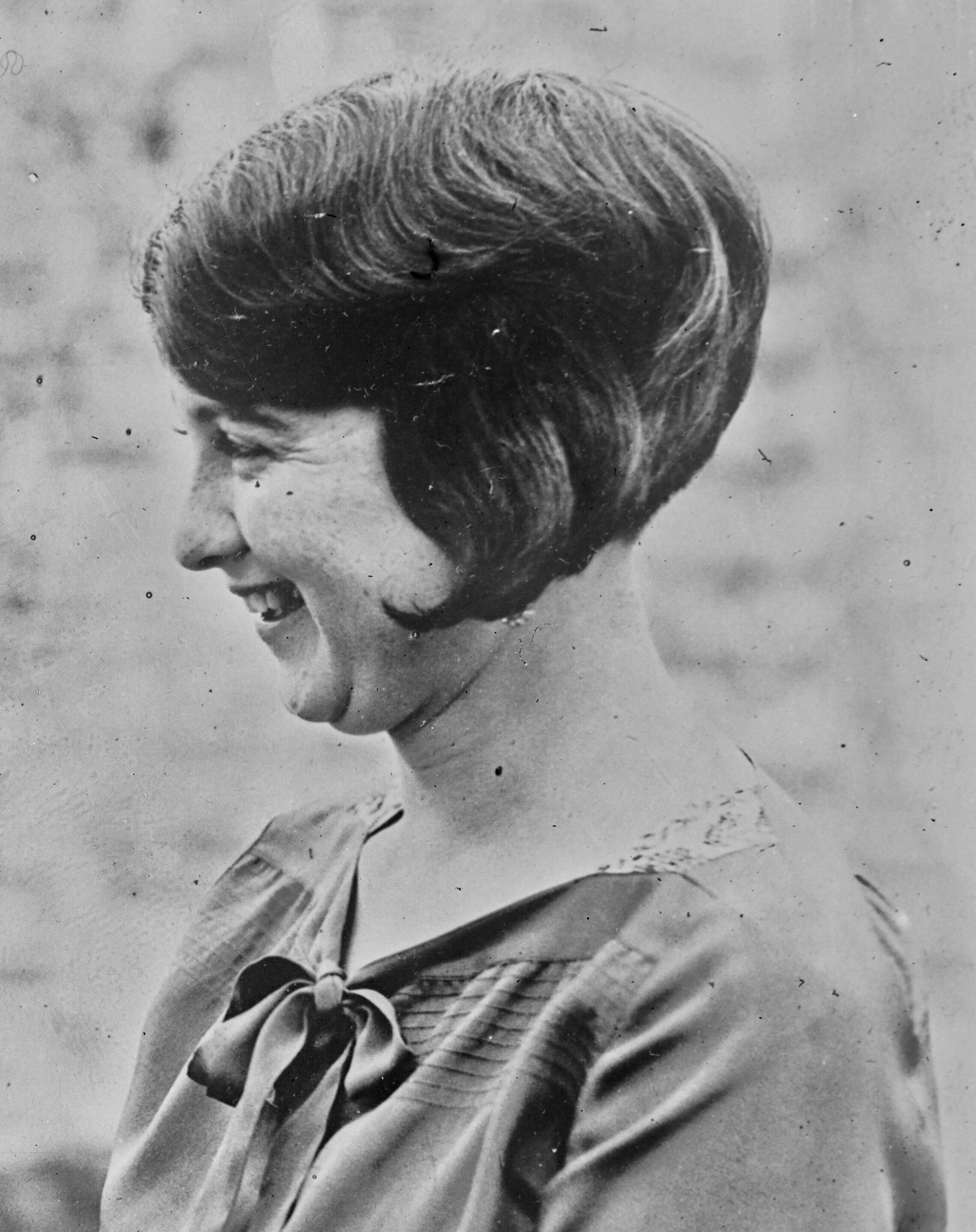
- García González in 1928

First Lady of Mexico
- In office December 1, 1928 – February 5, 1930
- President: Emilio Portes Gil
- Preceded by: Natalia Chacón (1927); Hortensia Elías Chacón (acting)
- Succeeded by: Josefina Ortiz

First Lady of Tamaulipas
- In office February 5, 1925 – June 4, 1928

Personal details
- Born: October 13, 1903 General Terán, Nuevo León, Mexico
- Died: May 8, 1979 (aged 75) Mexico City, Mexico
- Party: Institutional Revolutionary Party
- Spouse: Emilio Portes Gil (m. 1924; died 1978)
- Children: Two

Carmen García González (October 13, 1903 – May 8, 1979) was First Lady of Mexico and the wife of Emilio Portes Gil (1928-1930).

In 1929, she created the National Committee of Child Protection (Asociación de Protección a la Infancia) which founded maternity homes and childcare centres throughout Mexico.
