= Natalia Chacón =

Former First Lady of Mexico (1879-1927)

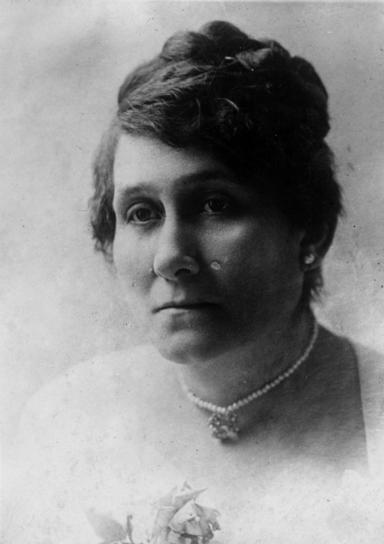
- Portrait of Natalia Chacón Amarillas

First Lady of Mexico
- In office 1 December 1924 – 2 June 1927
- President: Plutarco Elías Calles
- Preceded by: María Tapia
- Succeeded by: Hortensia Elías Chacón (acting); Carmen García González (1928)

Personal details
- Born: Natalia Chacón Amarillas; 1 December 1879 Mazatlán, Sinaloa, Mexico
- Died: 2 June 1927 (aged 47) Los Angeles, California, United States
- Party: Institutional Revolutionary Party
- Spouse: Plutarco Elías Calles (m. 1899)
- Children: 9

Natalia Chacón Amarillas (1 December 1879 – 2 June 1927) was a Mexican philanthropist and political figure, who became the First Lady of Mexico as the wife of the Mexican president Plutarco Elías Calles. At her initiative, children's canteens were created across the state, along with other essential charities to serve the needs of the poor.

== Biography ==
Natalia Amarillas was born in Mazatlán, Sinaloa on the first of December 1879. Her mother and father Andrés Chacón and Ventura Amarillas move to Guaymas, Sonora, where she spends her childhood and young adulthood.

She met Plutarco Elías Calles in Guaymas. He was a primary school teacher at the time.

In 1899 they married and moved together in Hermosillo, Sonora. They had nine children - five girls and four boys.

=== First Lady ===
At her initiative, the first-ever children's and poor people's canteens were created in Mexico, which served stew, milk, and bread. The food they served was often the only food those people had access to. Moreover, her focus went toward building medical dispensaries to serve the less favored society layers. She juggled both her first lady obligations, raising children, and being the wife of the president at the same time without neglecting any responsibilities.

She organized banquets often while leading the initiatives to feed children and the poor. Unfortunately due to having to raise nine children and various other responsibilities, she often fell ill with fever, insomnia, and various ailments. Due to her health complications, she stopped attending the Independence ceremonies, as well as other acts as first lady.

=== Death ===
When Natalia's condition worsened, the work of accompanying the president was carried out by her daughter Hortensia, who became the official replacement for the first lady. During the last day of Plutarco Calles's presidency of Mexico in 1927, Natalia Chacón Amarillas fell very ill with a pulmonary embolism and was transferred to a hospital in Los Angeles, California, where she underwent surgery on 23 May. However, she died on 2 June due to a gallbladder complication.
