= Pascual Ortiz Rubio =

President of Mexico from 1930 to 1932

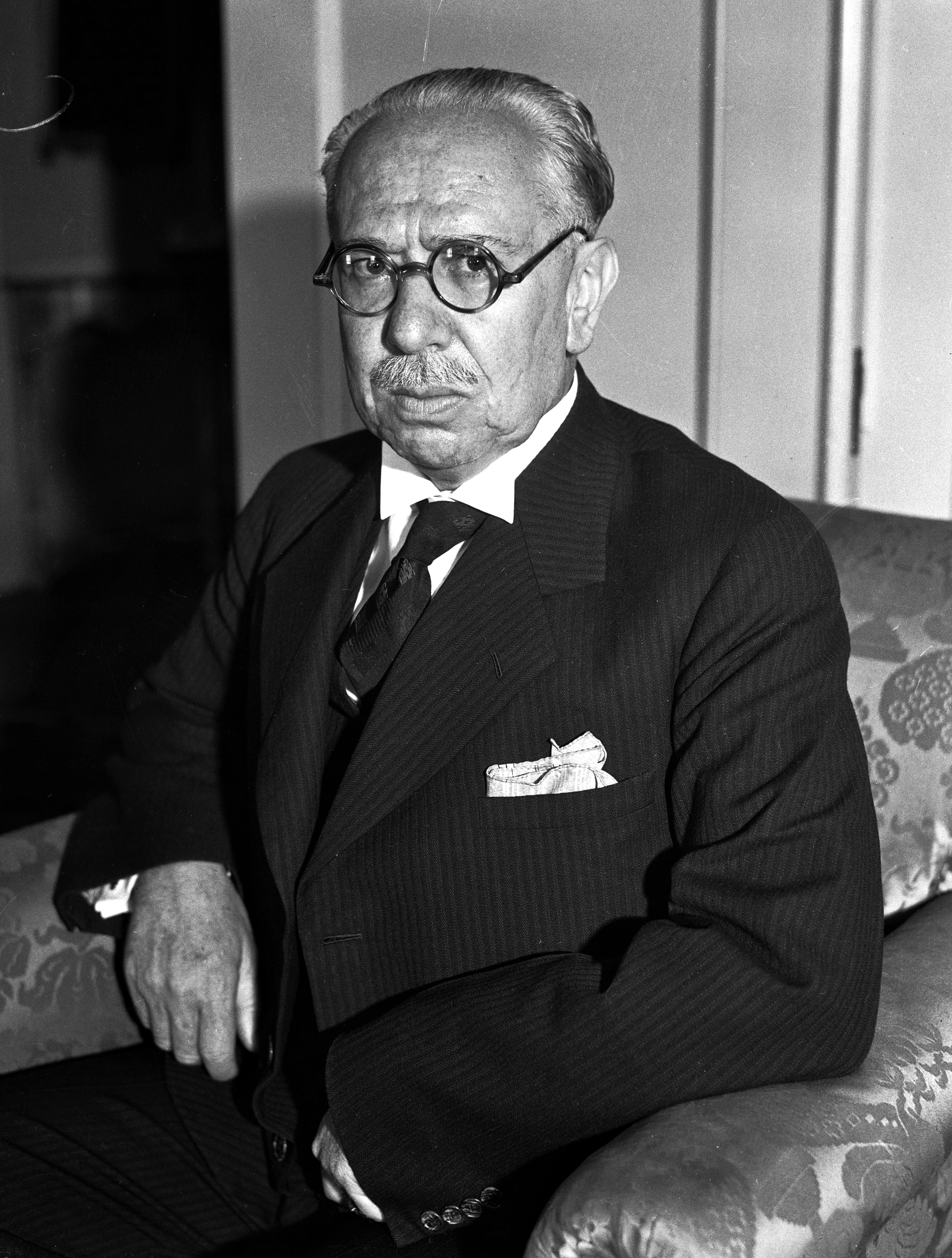
- Ortiz Rubio, 1932

49th President of Mexico
- In office 5 February 1930 – 2 September 1932
- Preceded by: Emilio Portes Gil
- Succeeded by: Abelardo L. Rodríguez

Member of the Chamber of Deputies for Michoacán's 2nd district
- In office 16 September 1912 – 10 October 1913
- Preceded by: Ricardo García Granados

Personal details
- Born: 10 March 1877 Morelia, Michoacán, Mexico
- Died: 4 November 1963 (aged 86) Mexico City, Mexico
- Party: National Revolutionary Party
- Spouse: Josefina Ortiz (m. 1920)
- Education: Michoacan University of Saint Nicholas of Hidalgo; National School of Mining (BS)

Pascual Ortiz Rubio (Spanish pronunciation: [pasˈkwal oɾˈtis ˈruβjo]; 10 March 1877 – 4 November 1963) was a Mexican military officer, topographical engineer, diplomat and politician who served as the 49th President of Mexico from 1930 to 1932. He was one of three presidents to serve out the six-year term (1928–1934) of assassinated president-elect Álvaro Obregón, while former president Plutarco Elías Calles retained power in a period known as the Maximato. Calles was so blatantly in control of the government that after an attempt on his life and pressures, Ortiz Rubio resigned the presidency in protest in September 1932, being the last Mexican president to date that has resigned.

== Early life and education ==
He was born in Morelia, Michoacán, the son of a lawyer and landowner, Pascual Ortiz de Ayala y Huerta, and Leonor Rubio Cornelis. He attended the Colegio de San Nicolás in state capital Morelia, training as an engineer. He became politically active as a student and was opposed to the re-election of Porfirio Díaz in 1896. With the outbreak of the Mexican Revolution in 1910 and the election of Francisco I. Madero in 1911, Ortiz Rubio was elected to the federal legislature as a representative from Michoacán. When General Victoriano Huerta forced Madero and his vice president to resign and then murdered them in February 1913, Huerta jailed Ortiz Rubio. Huerta was ousted in 1914 by several revolutionary factions, and the Federal Army collapsed with that defeat. Ortiz Rubio joined the Constitutionalist Army headed by Venustiano Carranza. With the rank of colonel initially, he rose to the rank of brigadier general. The Constitutionalist faction went on to defeat rival revolutionary factions.

== Career ==
=== Early positions ===
Ortiz Rubio served as Governor of Michoacán from 1917 to 1920, and then as secretary of communications from 1920 to 1921, under Sonoran generals Adolfo de la Huerta and Álvaro Obregón, who, along with fellow Sonoran Plutarco Elías Calles dominated politics in the 1920s. When Calles was elected president in 1924, Ortiz Rubio was appointed Mexican ambassador to Germany, and then Brazil.

=== Presidency 1929–1932 ===
Logo of the PNR

The Presidency of Ortiz Rubio has been seen as the apex of ex-President Calles's power as jefe máximo, with Ortiz Rubio portrayed as "puppet president". Although he is not the focus of major scholarly studies, his presidency has been examined in the context of post-revolutionary Mexican history.

On June 8, 1931, his nephew, Emilio Cortes Rubio, was killed by police officers in Ardmore, Oklahoma, while returning from Benedictine College.

==== Election of 1929 ====
President-elect Álvaro Obregón was assassinated in 1928, leaving a power vacuum. Since Calles could not succeed himself as president, he created a political party, the National Revolutionary Party (PNR). That move institutionalized power and was the way that Calles could maintain personal control of men holding the presidency. Emilio Portes Gil was interim president after the assassination, and new elections were set for 1929. Calles passed over Portes Gil and Aarón Sáenz, who had expected to become the candidate and tapped Ortiz Rubio to be PNR's candidate in the election of 17 November 1929. He ran against José Vasconcelos, Obregón's Secretary of Public Education, noted for his stance against corruption and Calles's authoritarian rule.

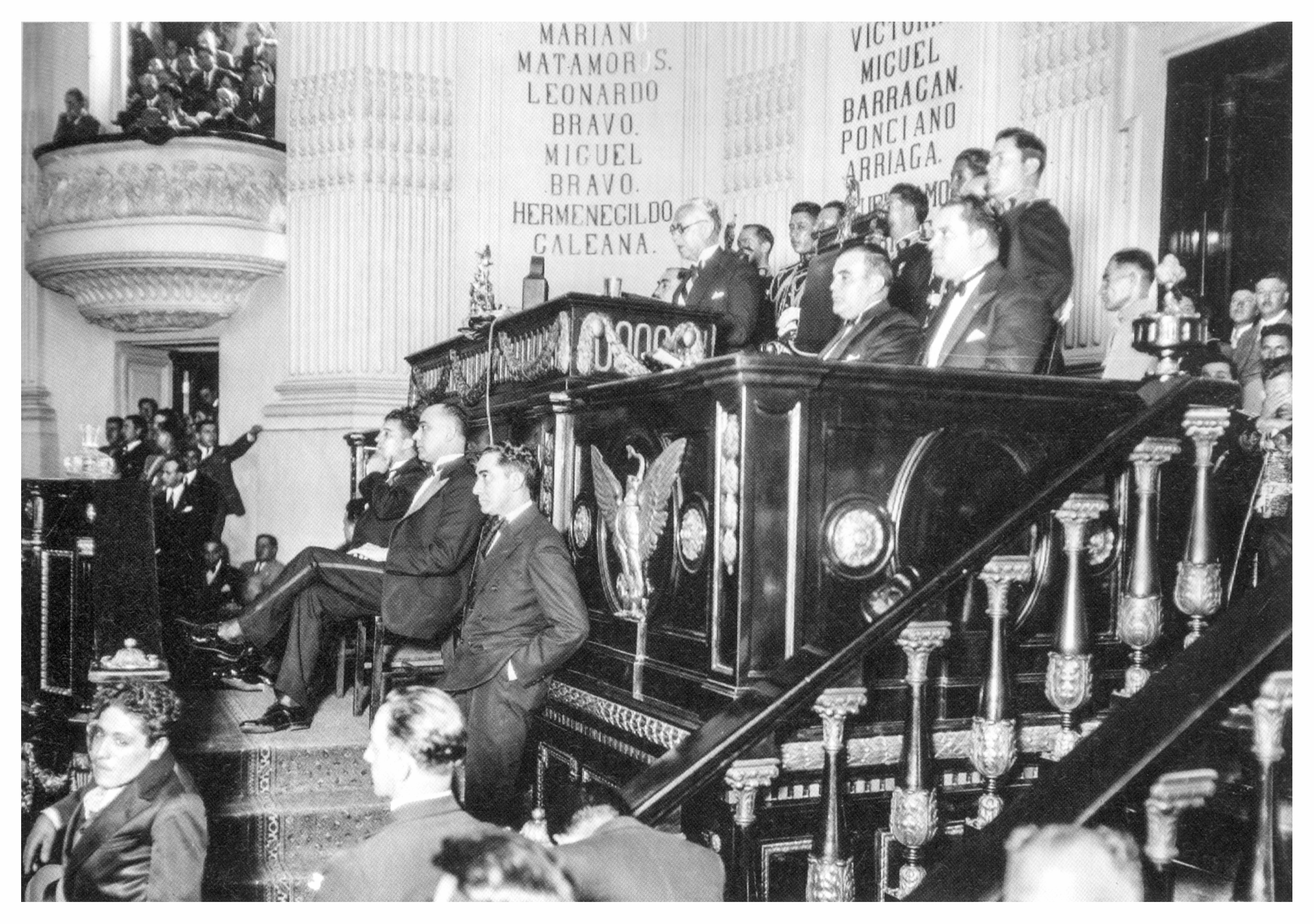
Inauguration of Ortiz Rubio on 5 February 1930

Ortiz Rubio had no independent power base that could counterbalance Calles, and so as president, he was seen an ineffective leader. Ortiz Rubio had been the ambassador to Brazil during crucial years in the 1920s that political alliances were forged. Vasconcelos was a strong opposition candidate who had considerable support among university students, the middle class, and some workers from northeast Mexico. Just before overtures from Cristeros to the Vasconcelos campaign led to further developments, the government concluded an agreement with the Vatican to bring the Cristero War to a close. It was believed at the time that Vasconcelos actually won the election. According to one report, the margin was only 700,000 votes. However, according to the official results of the 1929 elections, Ortiz Rubio's won by a landslide over Vasconcelos.

==== Cabinets ====
The cabinet of Ortiz Rubio underwent many changes in his brief presidency, many of which were at the behest of ex-President Plutarco Elías Calles. There were many familiar names in Mexican revolutionary politics. The interim president Portes Gil initially became Minister of the Interior, the highest ranking cabinet post, but there were multiple changes in the post, including the appointment of general Lázaro Cárdenas who served in 1931. As Minister of Public Education, the disappointed Aarón Sáenz presidential hopeful served briefly but quickly moved to lead the Ministry of Industry and Commerce. General Joaquín Amaro headed War and Navy as he had in the cabinets of Calles and of Portes Gil. At Agriculture and Development was General Manuel Pérez Treviño. The cabinet-level position of head of the Federal District that governed Mexico City was initially held by Dr. José Manuel Puig Casauranc, and during his term as president, he oversaw the passage of a new labor law and inaugurated the zoo in Chapultepec Park. Alleging excessive interference in his presidency by ex-President Calles, from whom Ortiz demonstrated independence while he was in office

=== 1930 assassination attempt ===
On February 5, 1930, the day Ortiz Rubio assumed the presidency at the National Stadium, he was heading to the National Palace to receive congratulations. As his car exited the building, it was attacked by Daniel Flores González, who fired six shots at the car, hitting him in the jaw. Flores was immediately arrested and interrogated

The attack shocked the public and political circles, occurring in a tense context following the 1929 presidential elections, in which Ortiz Rubio was accused by opponents of being imposed as a candidate by then-president Plutarco Elías Calles.

==== Perpetrator and aftermath ====
Daniel Flores González, from Charcas, San Luis Potosí, was reportedly sympathetic to the Vasconcelista movement led by José Vasconcelos, who had lost the 1929 election. Flores opposed what he saw as electoral fraud that favored Ortiz Rubio. His actions were seen as a protest against the regime established by Calles.

There were also claims that Flores may have been influenced by conspirators within the revolutionary circle, suggesting the attack had broader political motivations.

President Ortiz Rubio was hospitalized for two months due to his injuries. Although he survived, the attack affected his health and morale, negatively impacting his ability to govern. This event marked the beginning of a presidency heavily influenced by Calles, who maintained effective control over political decisions.

Daniel Flores González was sentenced to 19 years in prison for attempted assassination. However, on April 22, 1932, he was found dead in his cell at the Federal District Penitentiary, fueling speculation about possible reprisals or cover-ups.

=== Resignation ===
He resigned the presidency on 2 September 1932. He resigned "with my hands clean of blood or money" and later in his memoir called Calles's rule as a "thinly veiled dictatorship."

There was a brief constitutional controversy following Ortiz Rubio’s resignation. Article 83 of the 1917 Constitution originally stipulated that the presidential term was four years, while Article 84 set forth the procedures to be followed in the event of “the absolute vacancy of the President of the Republic” (including due to resignation). If the “absolute vacancy” occurred during the first two years of the presidential term, Congress was to appoint a provisional President and call for presidential elections, whereas if the “absolute vacancy” occurred during the last two years of the term, Congress was to appoint a substitute President to complete the presidential term.

In 1928, Article 83 was amended to extend the presidential term from four to six years; however, Article 84 was not amended to reflect this change. Ortiz Rubio resigned on September 2, 1932 (with just under three months remaining before the start of the final two years of the 1928–1934 term, which had begun on December 1, 1928); this sparked a debate among legislators and the public because, since Article 84 had not been amended, it was unclear what should happen next, given that the resignation had occurred neither during the first two years nor during the last two years of the 1928–1934 presidential term, thereby casting doubt on Congress’s authority to appoint a substitute President to serve for the remainder of the term, and some wondered whether it was necessary to call new elections.

The justification given by lawmakers for appointing a substitute President was that, although Article 84 had not in fact been amended in accordance with Article 83, “the intent of the framers of the Constitution in Querétaro [in 1917] was that when the permanent vacancy of the Presidency occurs during the first half of the presidential term, the appointee is only interim and must hand over the office to the person elected in the elections to be called by the General Congress; and if the absolute vacancy occurs during the second half, the person assuming the Presidency completes the term.” Interpreting Article 84 in this manner—that it should be understood in terms of “halves” of the presidential term—and given that Ortiz Rubio’s resignation occurred during the second half of the 1928–1934 term, Congress asserted its authority to appoint a substitute President to complete the presidential term.

The person appointed by Congress as substitute President, a day after Ortiz Rubio's resignation, was Abelardo L. Rodríguez, a revolutionary general and another protégé of Calles, who served the remaining two years of the six-year term.

The discrepancy between Articles 83 and 84 of the Constitution was finally resolved in 1933, when Article 84 was amended. Under the new amendment, the provision was retained that if the President’s “absolute vacancy” occurred during the first two years of the term, Congress must appoint a provisional President and call new elections, whereas if it occurs during the last four years of the term, Congress must appoint a substitute President to complete the term; this is the formula that has remained in effect to this day (although it has not yet been applied, given that, to date, Ortiz Rubio has been the last Mexican president to resign).

== Later life ==
On September 4, 1932, two days after his resignation, Ortiz Rubio went into self-exile in the United States. He returned to Mexico in 1935, following the 1934 election of President Lázaro Cárdenas, a fellow son of Michoacán. In 1942, President Manuel Ávila Camacho invited many former presidents of Mexico as a show of unity to join together in a public event at the Zócalo in Mexico City, with Emilio Portes Gil, Pascual Ortiz Rubio, Abelardo Rodríguez, the three presidents during the Maximato, along with Lázaro Cárdenas and Plutarco Elías Calles.

In 1963, Ortiz Rubio published a memoir.

=== Death ===
On November 4, 1963, Ortiz Rubio died in Mexico City.

== Gallery ==
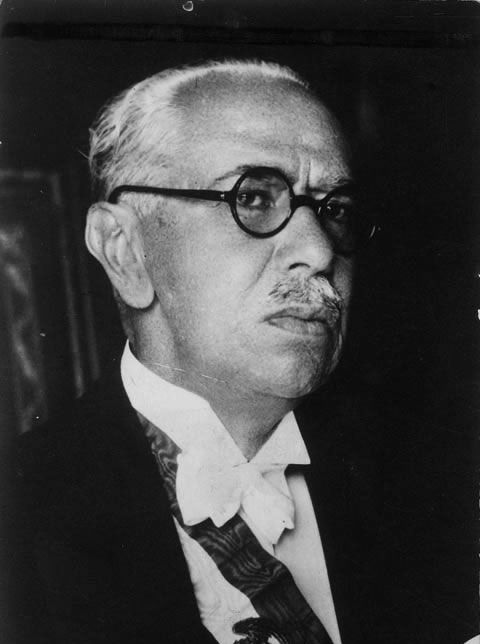
Pascual Ortiz Rubio wearing the presidential sash, 1930

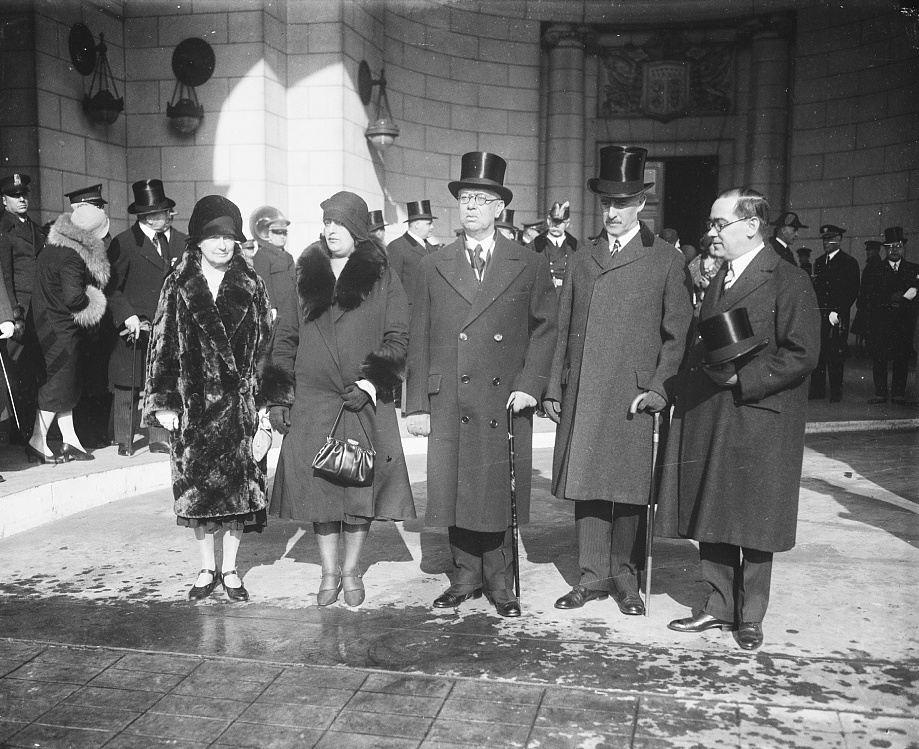

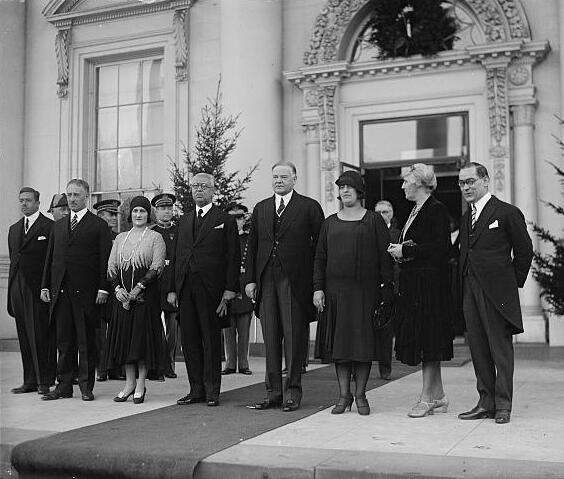

== See also ==
- Plutarco Elías Calles
- List of heads of state of Mexico
- Maximato

Political offices
Preceded by Emilio Portes Gil	President of Mexico; 1930–1932	Succeeded by Abelardo L. Rodríguez
