= Emilio Portes Gil =

President of Mexico from 1928 to 1930

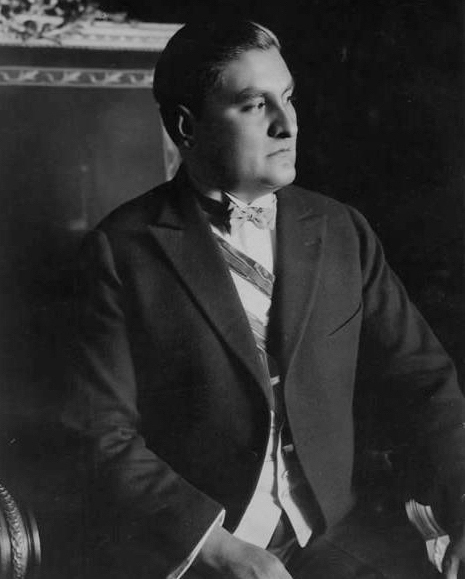
- Emilio Portes Gil, 1928

48th President of Mexico
- In office 1 December 1928 – 5 February 1930
- Preceded by: Plutarco Elías Calles
- Succeeded by: Pascual Ortiz Rubio

Attorney General of Mexico
- In office 5 September 1932 – 30 November 1934
- President: Abelardo L. Rodríguez
- Preceded by: José Aguilar y Maya
- Succeeded by: Silvestre Castro

Secretary of the Interior
- In office 5 February 1930 – 28 April 1930
- President: Pascual Ortiz Rubio
- Preceded by: Carlos Riva Palacio
- Succeeded by: Carlos Riva Palacio
- In office 18 August 1928 – 30 November 1928
- President: Plutarco Elías Calles
- Preceded by: Adalberto Tejeda Olivares
- Succeeded by: Felipe Canales Salinas

Member of the Chamber of Deputies for Tamaulipas's 3rd district
- In office 1 September 1922 – 4 February 1925
- Preceded by: Eliseo L. Céspedes
- Succeeded by: Lorenzo de la Garza

Member of the Chamber of Deputies for Tamaulipas's 4th district
- In office 1 September 1918 – 31 August 1920

Personal details
- Born: Emilio Cándido Portes Gil; 3 October 1890 Ciudad Victoria, Tamaulipas, Mexico
- Died: 10 December 1978 (aged 88) Mexico City, Mexico
- Resting place: Panteón Francés
- Party: National Revolutionary Party (PRN)
- Spouse: Carmen García González (m. 1924)
- Children: 2

Emilio Cándido Portes Gil (Spanish pronunciation: [eˈmiljo ˈpoɾtes xil]; 3 October 1890 – 10 December 1978) was a Mexican politician, lawyer and diplomat who served as the 48th President of Mexico from 1928 to 1930, one of three to serve out the six-year term of president-elect General Álvaro Obregón, who had been assassinated in 1928. Since the 1917 Constitution forbade re-election of a serving president, incumbent President Plutarco Elías Calles could not formally retain the presidency. Portes Gil replaced him, but Calles, the "Jefe Máximo", retained effective political power during what is known as the Maximato.

== Early life and education ==
Portes Gil was of Dominican descent and was born in Ciudad Victoria, the capital of the state of Tamaulipas, in northeastern Mexico. He was a relative of Trina de Moya, a Dominican poet and former first lady of the Dominican Republic.

Although his grandfather had been a prominent politician in Tamaulipas, Portes Gil's father died when Emilio was young. He lived with his widowed mother in straitened circumstances, but a state grant helped Portes Gil receive certification as a schoolteacher. He sought to study law.

== Early career ==
He was in law school during the outbreak of the Mexican Revolution and in late 1914, he allied himself with "First Chief" Venustiano Carranza, head of the Constitutionalist faction, who assumed the presidency of the country the following May. When Portes Gil graduated from law school in 1915, he had already begun his career in the public administration with a posting in the Constitutionalist faction's Department of Military Justice.

Portes Gil became part of the Northern leadership of the Constitutionalist Army, particularly Álvaro Obregón, who had defeated Pancho Villa's forces and eliminated them as a political or military factor in Mexico after 1915. Key to his subsequent political career was Sonoran general Plutarco Elías Calles. Portes Gil demonstrated skills as a lawyer and administrator, which catapulted him into the presidency of Mexico when Obregón was assassinated in 1928.

Over the ensuing years, he continued to serve the government in both a legal capacity (state supreme court justice in Sonora; legal advisor to the Ministry of War) and in elective office: he was elected to Congress in 1917, 1921, and 1923, and he served as governor of his native Tamaulipas on two occasions (1920 and 1925).

== Presidency ==
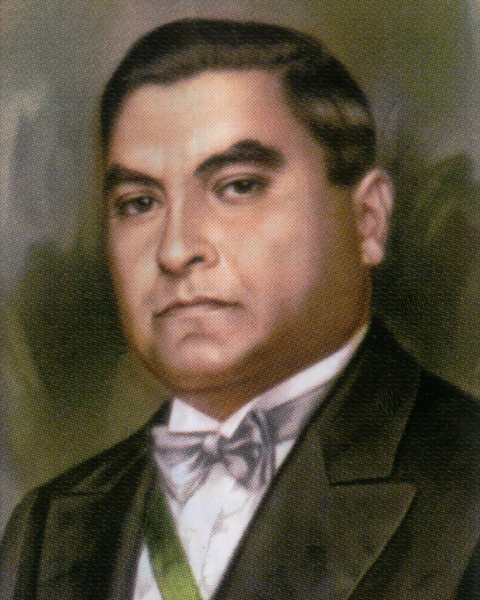
Oil painting of Portes Gil, c.1930

Between 28 August and 30 November 1928, he was Minister of the Interior (Gobernación) in the cabinet of Plutarco Elías Calles. When president-elect Álvaro Obregón was assassinated on 17 July 1928 by a Catholic opponent, a political solution to the crisis that did not include Calles returning to the presidency was necessary. Portes Gil, with the agreement of Calles, assumed office as interim president for a period of 14 months, when fresh elections were called.

Portes Gil inherited a widespread religious rebellion, the Cristero War, which Calles had provoked by aggressively enforcing anticlerical laws. As president, Portes Gil secretly negotiated the end to the conflict between the Catholic Church and the Mexican government, which created a modus vivendi that lasted decades. He had reassured the Catholic Church that its officials could petition congress to amend laws that it found to be offensive and that the government would not interfere with its internal operations. The government also granted a general amnesty to Cristero fighters. In 1929 Paramahansa Yogananda, founder of Self-Realization Fellowship, spent two months in Mexico, during which time President Portes Gil hosted the great guru. President Portes Gil afterwards became a longtime admirer of Yogananda's teachings and later served as ambassador to India.

Faced with a university strike, he defused the situation by convening a special session of Congress, which ultimately enacted the legislation granting autonomy to the National University of Mexico. His settling the strike is one of the acts for which he is best remembered as president.

He also attempted to negotiate the withdrawal of the United States troops from Nicaragua, in exchange for the surrender of Nicaraguan General Augusto Sandino. When the talks failed, he granted Sandino political asylum in Mexico and a parcel of land in Temixco, Morelos.

Portes Gil attempted to steer government officials away from self-enrichment during their terms of office. He wanted his office-holders to "know how to be loyal to institutions, and like the country want the triumph of the Revolution."

His administration embarked on public works projects building schools, hospitals, and housing for the benefit of ordinary Mexicans. In Mexico City, a new hospital for tuberculosis patients was inaugurated; the physical plant of the National Preparatory School, housed in the colonial-era Colegio de San Ildefonso, was expanded; a major sports center open to all, built on a former city dump; and new police and fire stations built in Art Deco design.

== Later life ==
He handed on the presidential sash to Pascual Ortiz Rubio on 5 February 1930, but effective power still remained in the hands of Calles. Portes Gil later served for 18 months as interior minister.

He subsequently traveled to Europe as Mexico's first representative to the League of Nations. Under later presidents, he served in various capacities, including ambassador to India, foreign minister, attorney-general, and president of the Partido Nacional Revolucionario (National Revolutionary Party).

In 1933, Lázaro Cárdenas was chosen as the party's official candidate for the 1934 presidential elections. Calles attempted to retain his own power as he had endeavored to do throughout the Maximato, but Cárdenas outmaneuvered Calles politically and eventually exiled him from Mexico. Cárdenas put Portes Gil in charge of purging the party of Callista elements. Since Portes Gil was "one of the 'puppet presidents' so unceremoniously dumped by Calles, [Portes Gil] was happy to serve".

Cárdenas reorganized the party as the Partido de la Revolución Mexicana (PRM), setting the structural form of sectoral representation that was retained by its 1946 successor, the Institutional Revolutionary Party (PRI). Cárdenas, however, returned Portes Gil to his stronghold in Tamaulipas once the former president had performed his task since the latter had "attempted to build up his own position for a possible political comeback".

Portes Gil retired from politics in 1936. In 1964, he attended the inauguration of President Gustavo Díaz Ordaz. He died of a heart attack in Mexico City in 1978, at the age of 88.

== See also ==
- List of heads of state of Mexico

Political offices
| Preceded by Plutarco Elías Calles | President of Mexico; 1928–1930 | Succeeded by Pascual Ortiz Rubio |
| Preceded by José Aguilar y Maya | Attorney General of Mexico; 1932–1934 | Succeeded by Silvestre Castro |
| Preceded by Carlos Riva Palacio | Secretary of the Interior; 1930 | Succeeded by Carlos Riva Palacio |
| Preceded by Gonzalo Vázquez Vela | Secretary of the Interior; 1928 | Succeeded by Felipe Canales |
Party political offices
| Preceded by – | President of the Revolutionary National Party; 1929–1930 | Succeeded by Lázaro Cárdenas |
| Preceded by Matías Ramos Santos | President of the Revolutionary National Party; 1935–1936 | Succeeded by Silvano Barba González |
