= Maximato =

Period of Mexican history

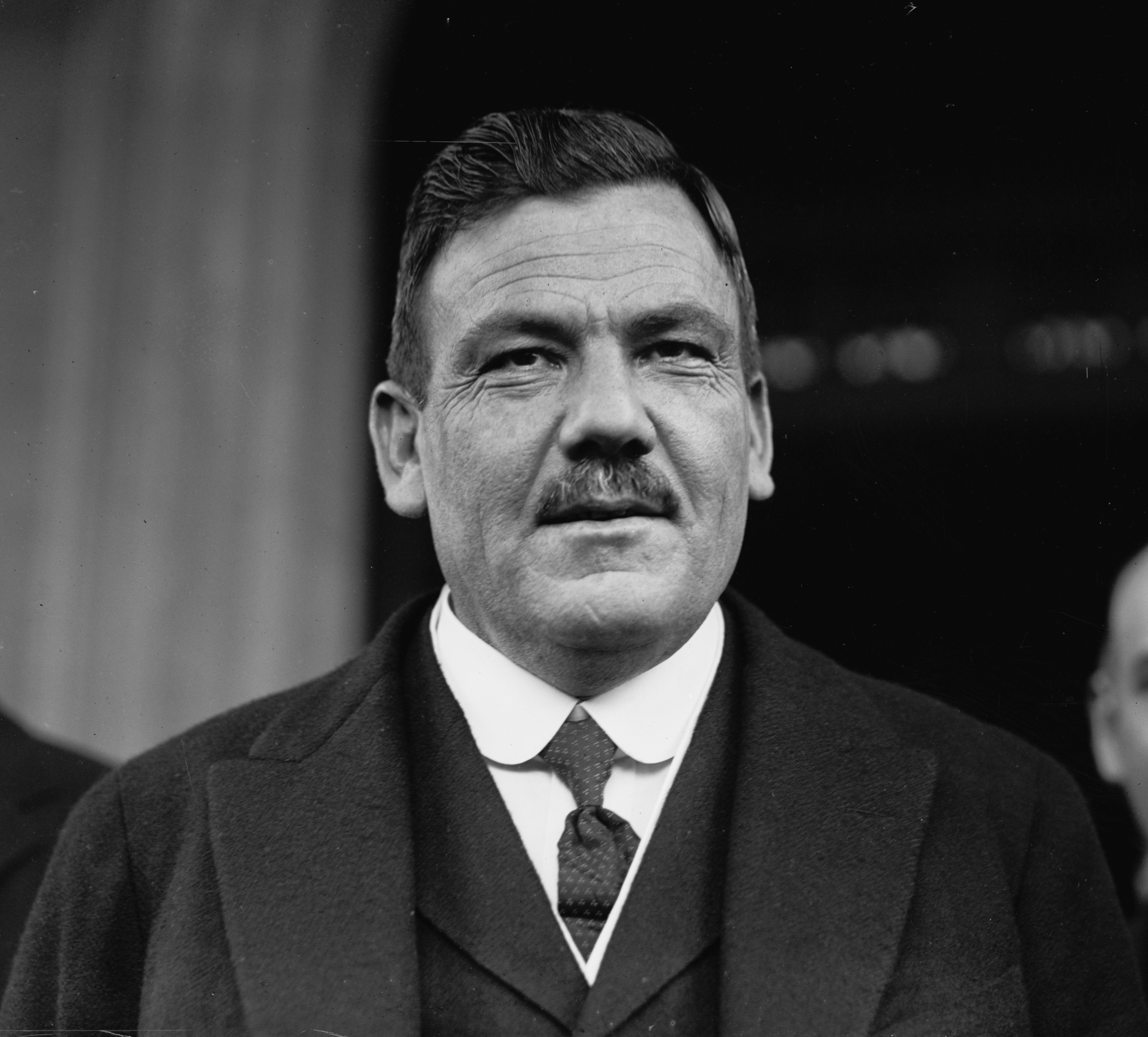
Plutarco Elías Calles, called the jefe máximo. He was seen as the de facto leader of Mexico during the Maximato.

The Maximato was a transitional period in the historical and political development of Mexico from 1 December 1928 to 1 December 1934. Named after former president Plutarco Elías Calles's sobriquet el Jefe Máximo (the supreme leader), the Maximato was the period in which Calles continued to exercise power and exert influence without holding the presidency. The six-year period was the term that President-elect Alvaro Obregón would have served if he had not been assassinated immediately after the July 1928 elections.

Following Obregón's death, a solution to the presidential succession crisis was in immediate need. Calles could not hold the presidency again because of restrictions on re-election without an interval out of power, but he remained the dominant figure in Mexico.

There were two solutions to the crisis. Firstly, an interim president was to be appointed, followed by new elections. Secondly, Calles created an enduring political institution, the Partido Nacional Revolucionario (PNR), which held the presidency from 1929 to 2000.

The interim presidency of Emilio Portes Gil lasted from 1 December 1928 to 4 February 1930. He was passed over as candidate for the newly formed PNR in favor of a political unknown, Pascual Ortiz Rubio, who resigned in September 1932 in protest at Calles's continued wielding of the real power. The successor was Abelardo L. Rodríguez, who served out the rest of the term that ended in 1934. As President, Rodríguez exerted more independence from Calles than had Ortiz Rubio. That year's election was won by the former revolutionary general Lázaro Cárdenas, who had been chosen as the candidate for the PNR. Following the election, Calles attempted to exert control over Cárdenas, but with strategic allies Cárdenas outmaneuvered Calles politically and expelled him and his major allies from the country in 1936.

The Maximato was a transitional period of personal power for ex-President Calles, but the institutionalization of political power in the party structure was a major achievement in Mexican history.

== Background ==
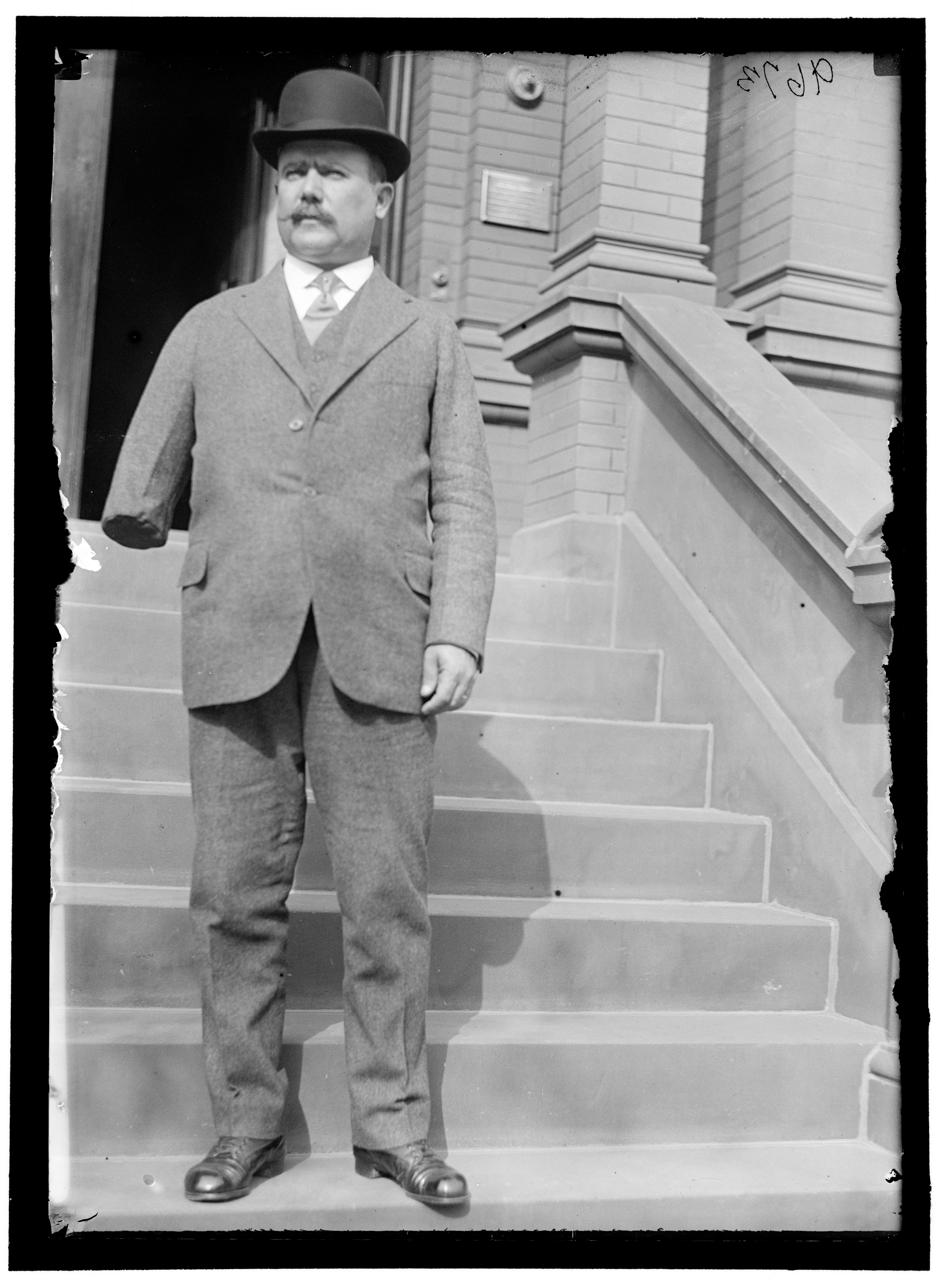
President Obregón in a business suit, tailored to show the loss of his right arm sustained while fighting in the Mexican Revolution. He was assassinated in 1928.

Enshrined in the ideologies of those that carried out the Mexican Revolution was the premise of "no re-election", since a hallmark of the preceding Porfiriato was President Díaz's perennial, protracted re-election over the course of more than three decades. After the Revolution, Adolfo de la Huerta, Alvaro Obregón, and Plutarco Elías Calles dominated Mexican politics in the 1920s, each being revolutionary generals from the northwestern state of Sonora. When the term of President Venustiano Carranza ended in 1920, he attempted to install Ignacio Bonillas in the office as his puppet successor, this caused the three Sonoran generals to revolt. They issued the Plan of Agua Prieta to justify their actions, and De la Huerta served as interim president for a six-month span between June and November 1920. Obregón then contested and won the 1920 presidential election, serving a four-year term. To succeed him in the 1924 election, Obregón backed Calles over De la Huerta, who led a failed revolt and then fled to the United States. Calles won, and served from 1924 to 1928. Obregón remained a powerful presence behind the Calles presidency, and Calles pushed through a constitutional change that allowed for a non-consecutive presidential re-election. That would allow Obregón to run for re-election in 1928, and potentially Calles to run in the election after that. Obregón was duly elected as Calles's successor, but was assassinated in July by José de León Toral, a Catholic militant, before he could take office. Public reaction to the assassination was "surprise, confusion, [and] sometimes hysteria". Calles allowed the anger of Obregón's supporters to flow, and deflected it elsewhere—toward the labor leader Luis N. Morones of the powerful Regional Confederation of Mexican Workers (CROM), who might have been responsible for the assassination to gain power himself; and toward the assassin, Toral. Toral's interrogation was left to Obregón's supporters.

== Creating the PNR ==
Logo of the Partido Nacional Revolucionario, with the colors of the Mexican flag.

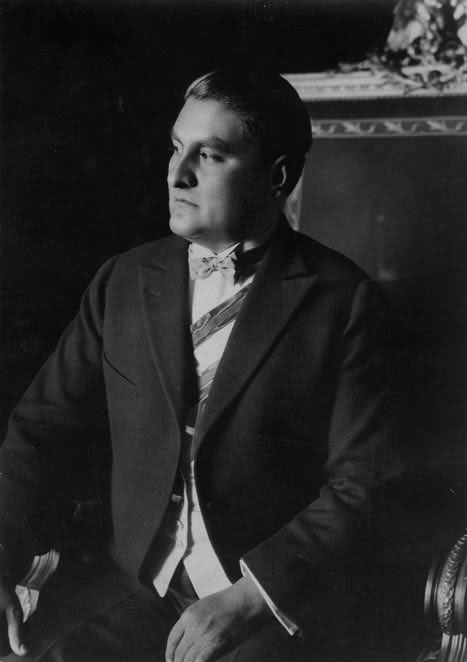
Emilio Portes Gil, interim president of Mexico of 1928 to 1930.

Since Calles could not succeed himself in the presidency but wished to retain power, he sought a political solution. The long-term solution he conceived was momentous for Mexican politics. In his final informe or report to congress on 1 September 1928, a little more than a month after Obregón's assassination, he declared that "There is no personality of indisputable stature, with a firm hold on public opinion and enough personal and political force to merit general confidence through is mere name and prestige." He went on to call for "the peaceful evolutionary development of Mexico as an institutional country, in which men may become, as they should be, mere accidents with no real importance beside the perpetual and august serenity of institutions and laws."

Calles had already called on thirty prominent generals, who might have vied for power in the wake of Obregón's assassination, to agree to a civilian as interim president until new elections could take place. Emilio Portes Gil became interim president, taking office on 1 December 1928, the date on which Obregón's government was to begin, until 5 February 1930, when the term of constitutional president Pascual Ortiz Rubio began. His presidency was strongly influenced by Plutarco Elías Calles, to the point that he selected the members of the presidential cabinet, despite which Portes Gil was able to carry out his own political projects in the country. On 3 March 1929, the Escobar Rebellion began with the publication of the Plan of Hermosillo, which accused Calles of the death of Obregón, declared itself against the government of Portes Gil, and proclaimed General José Gonzalo Escobar as president. This insurrection allowed Calles to be appointed Secretary of War and Navy, a position he used, together with the Escobar Rebellion, to rid himself of generals whose loyalty to him he doubted. Among the main actions during his presidency were the creation of the National Revolutionary Party on 4 March 1929, and the organization of the 1929 presidential election, in which the main contenders were José Vasconcelos and Pascual Ortiz Rubio. Calles retained power, despite his having said that "never, for any motivation and in no circumstances will the current president of the Republic of Mexico come to occupy that position again." That declaration was a repudiation of the constitutional change that had allowed re-election of previous president and forestalled any president in the future from seeking re-election.

Not all the generals were on board with the new political arrangement. General José Gonzalo Escobar led a rebellion in March 1929 against the interim Portes Gil government. The U.S. backed the interim government and Escobar was unable to obtain arms, so the revolt failed. Although short-lived, it highlighted the necessity of finding a better mechanism for the transfer of the presidency as well as to bring to an end the Cristero War. Calles himself took command of government troops to suppress the months' long Escobar Rebellion.

Calles took the lead in founding the Partido Nacional Revolucionario or PNR, the predecessor of today's Partido Revolucionario Institucional (PRI). It was the institutionalized way for Calles's faction to control presidential succession. It succeeded as a party by bringing in a number of different elements, including regional and local political organizations, organized labor, organized peasants, and professionals such as government bureaucrats and teachers. The party gained secure revenue and organizational strength by requiring members of constituent organizations be dues-paying members of the party. It became a national party, designed to exist as an institution rather than a coalition that came into being only during elections, and was successful in elections for local, state, and national offices.

Officially, after 1929, Calles served as minister of war, as he continued to suppress the rebellion of the Cristero War; however, a few months later, following the intervention of the United States ambassador Dwight Morrow, the Mexican government and the Cristeros signed a peace treaty.

== Presidency of Pascual Ortiz Rubio ==
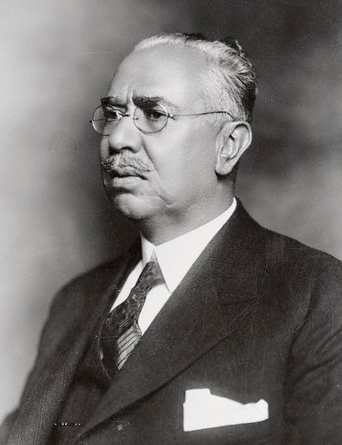
Pascual Ortiz Rubio, president of Mexico of 1930 to 1932.

The PNR candidate chosen for the 1929 was a political unknown, Pascual Ortiz Rubio, who had no independent power base. During the two years that Ortiz Rubio was titular president of Mexico, Calles was the power behind the presidency.

Ortiz Rubio won the controversial 1929 election, in which he defeated the philosopher José Vasconcelos of the National Antireelectionist Party (PNA), whose campaign was supported mainly by university students, and Pedro Rodríguez Triana of the Mexican Communist Party (PCM). The election was marred by violence and fraud, and Vasconcelos refused to accept the result. Dozens of anti-reelectionists were killed, and Vasconcelos left the country.

Once the conflict-ridden 1929 election was over, Ortiz Rubio was inaugurated on 5 February 1930, but not without lingering acrimony. During his inauguration ceremony, Ortiz Rubio was wounded in an assassination attempt by an antireelectionist student, Daniel Flores, who was tried and received the death penalty.

During the Maximato, Calles became increasingly authoritarian. After a large demonstration in 1930, the Mexican Communist Party was banned; Mexico ended its support for the rebels of César Sandino in Nicaragua; strikes were no longer tolerated; and the government ceased redistributing lands among poorer peasants. Calles had once been the candidate of the workers, and at one point had used Communist unions in his campaign against competing labor organizers; but later, having acquired wealth and engaging in finance, suppressed Communism. Overall, the Maximato was characterized by growing polarization and radicalization on both sides of the political spectrum, with left-wing and right-wing groups often fighting against each other in the streets of Mexico's cities. In 1932, Calles forced Ortiz Rubio to step down because of the latter's appointment of several anti-Callists in public functions.

== Presidency of Abelardo L. Rodríguez, 1932–1934 ==
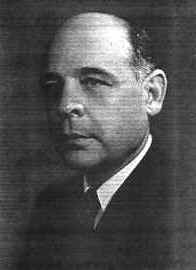
Abelardo L. Rodríguez, substitute president of Mexico of 1932 to 1934

Ortiz Rubio was succeeded by General Abelardo L. Rodríguez, who was an ally and protégé of Calles. Since Ortiz Rubio had resigned having served a sufficient length of time as president not to trigger a new election, Rodríguez was appointed substitute president by congress. Although Calles remained influential during Rodríguez's term of office, he was not as involved politically due to his own ill health and the illness and then death of his young second wife in 1932. Rodríguez established clear boundaries around Calles's actions and made it clear that he, Rodríguez, was president of Mexico, due all the honor and power of the office.

Rodríguez was known for his progressive reforms. Under his presidency social legislation promised by the Mexican constitution of 1917 was introduced for the first time, including a minimum wage and the 8-hour working day. During Rodríguez's presidency the constitutional amendment that allowed for re-election was repealed and the presidential term was extended to six years.

Rodríguez's secretary of education Narciso Bassols tried to implement a system of "socialist education", and the constitution was amended for this purpose, although its provisions which sought to suppress religion were removed from the constitution in 1946. The introduction of sex education proved to be very controversial, and after the protestations of conservative parents, Bassols was forced to step down and socialist education was eventually abandoned.

== End ==
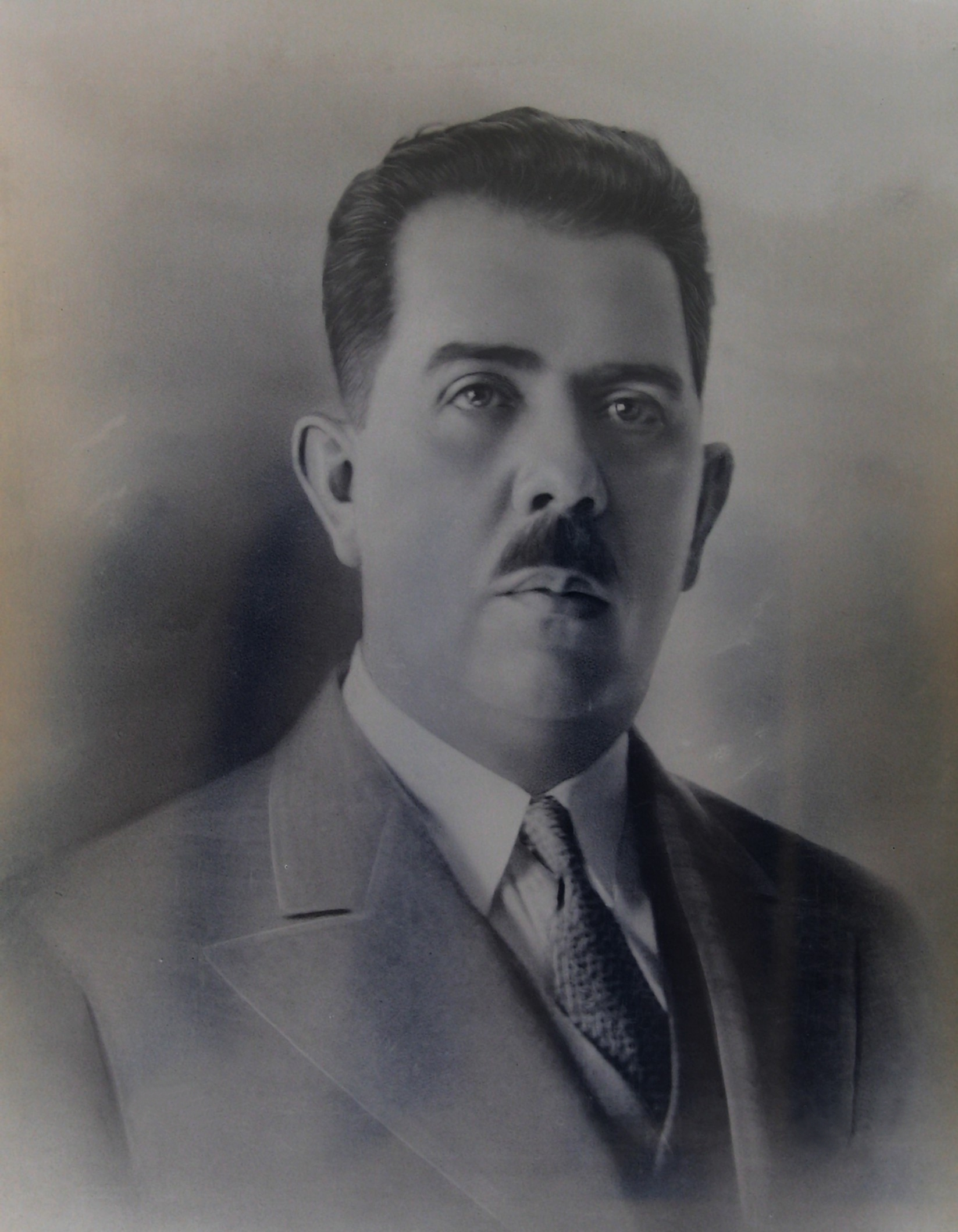
Lázaro Cárdenas

In 1934, the PNR selected revolutionary general Lázaro Cárdenas from Michoacán as its presidential candidate. Soon after his inauguration, however, conflicts between Calles and Cárdenas started to arise. Calles opposed Cárdenas's support for labor unions, especially his tolerance and support for strikes, and Cárdenas opposed Calles's violent methods and his closeness to fascist organizations, most notably the Gold Shirts, led by General Nicolás Rodríguez Carrasco, which harassed communists, Jews, and Chinese.

Cárdenas started to isolate Calles politically by removing the callistas from political posts and exiling his most powerful allies: Tomás Garrido Canabal, Fausto Topete, Emilio Portes Gil, Saturnino Cedillo, Aarón Sáenz, and finally Calles himself. Calles and Luis Napoleon Morones, one of the last remaining influential callistas, were charged with conspiring to blow up a railroad, placed under arrest under the order of President Cárdenas, and deported on April 9, 1936, to the United States. At the time of his arrest, Calles was reportedly reading a Spanish translation of Adolf Hitler's Mein Kampf.

== Bibliography ==
- Delgado de Cantú, Gloria M. (2008). Historia de México. Legado histórico y pasado reciente [History of Mexico. Historical Legacy and Recent Past] (2nd ed.). Pearson Educación. p. 640. ISBN 978-970-26-1274-2.
