= Lázaro Cárdenas =

President of Mexico from 1934 to 1940

- Cárdenas, c. 1937

51st President of Mexico
- In office 1 December 1934 – 30 November 1940
- Preceded by: Abelardo L. Rodríguez
- Succeeded by: Manuel Ávila Camacho

Secretary of National Defence
- In office 1 September 1942 – 31 August 1945
- President: Manuel Ávila Camacho
- Preceded by: Jesús Agustín Castro
- Succeeded by: Francisco Luis Urquizo

Secretary of War and Navy
- In office 1 January 1933 – 15 May 1933
- President: Abelardo L. Rodríguez
- Preceded by: Pablo Quiroga Escamilla
- Succeeded by: Pablo Quiroga Escamilla

Governor of Michoacán
- In office 1928–1932
- Preceded by: Luis Méndez
- Succeeded by: Dámaso Cárdenas

President of the Institutional Revolutionary Party
- In office 16 October 1930 – 27 August 1931
- Preceded by: Emilio Portes Gil
- Succeeded by: Manuel Pérez Treviño

Personal details
- Born: José Lázaro Cárdenas del Río; 21 May 1895 Jiquilpan, Michoacán, Mexico
- Died: 19 October 1970 (aged 75) Mexico City, Mexico
- Resting place: Monument to the Revolution; Mexico City, Mexico
- Party: Institutional Revolutionary Party
- Spouse: Amalia Solórzano (m. 1932)
- Children: Cuauhtémoc Cárdenas; Alicia Cárdenas
- Occupation: Statesman, General

Military service
- Allegiance: Mexico
- Branch/service: Mexican Army
- Years of service: 1913–1933; 1941–1945
- Rank: General
- Commands: Mexican Revolution, World War II

Lázaro Cárdenas del Río (Spanish: [ˈlasaɾo ˈkaɾðenas]; 21 May 1895 – 19 October 1970) was a Mexican general, statesman, and revolutionary who served as the 51st president of Mexico from 1934 to 1940. Previously, he served as a general in the Constitutional Army during the Mexican Revolution and as Governor of Michoacán and President of the Institutional Revolutionary Party. He later served as the Secretary of National Defence. During his presidency, which is considered the end of the Maximato, he implemented massive land reform programs, led the nationalization of the country's oil industry, and implemented a welfare state.

Born in Jiquilpan, Michoacán, to a working-class family, Cárdenas joined the Mexican Revolution and became a general in the Constitutionalist Army. Although he was not from the state of Sonora, whose revolutionary generals dominated Mexican politics in the 1920s, Cárdenas was hand-picked by Plutarco Elías Calles, Sonoran general and former president of Mexico, as a presidential candidate and won in the 1934 general election.

After founding the National Revolutionary Party (PNR) in the wake of the assassination of president-elect Álvaro Obregón, Plutarco Elías Calles had unofficially remained in power during the Maximato (1928–1934) and expected to maintain that role when Cárdenas took office. Cárdenas, however, out-maneuvered him politically and forced Calles into exile. He established the structure of the National Revolutionary Party, eventually renamed the Party of the Mexican Revolution (PRM), on the sectoral representation of peasant leagues, labor union confederations, and the Mexican Army. Cárdenas's incorporation of the army into the party structure was a deliberate move to diminish the power of the military and prevent their intervention in politics through coups d'état.

A left-wing economic nationalist, Cárdenas led the expropriation of the Mexican oil industry and the creation of the state-owned oil company Pemex in 1938. He implemented large-scale land reform programs in Mexico, redistributing large estates to smallholders in lands termed ejidos. He created the National Polytechnic Institute (IPN) and El Colegio de México (Colmex). His foreign policy supported and gave asylum to Republicans during the Spanish Civil War. An achievement of Cárdenas was his complete surrender of power in December 1940 to his successor, Manuel Ávila Camacho, who was a political moderate without a distinguished military record.

Cárdenas has been praised as "the greatest constructive radical of the Mexican Revolution", for implementing its ideals, but has also been criticized as an "authoritarian populist". He was the first post-revolutionary Mexican president to serve for a sexenio, a practice that continues today. According to numerous opinion polls and analysts, Cárdenas is the most popular Mexican president of the 20th century.

== Early life and career ==
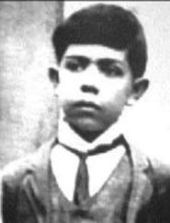
Cárdenas as a child, c.1900

Lázaro Cárdenas del Río was born on 21 May 1895, one of eight children in a lower-middle-class family in the village of Jiquilpan, Michoacán, where his father (Dámaso Cárdenas Pineda) owned a billiard hall. His family was of prominent Purépecha ancestry. After the death of his father in 1911, from the age of 16, Cárdenas supported his family (including his mother and seven younger siblings). By the time he reached 18, he had worked as a tax collector, a printer's devil, and a jail keeper. Although he left school when he was eleven, he used every opportunity to educate himself and read widely throughout his life, especially works of history.

=== Military career ===
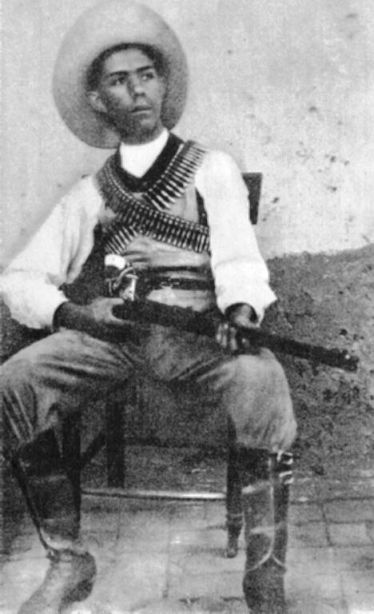
Cárdenas in the Constitutional Army, c.1913

Cárdenas set his sights on becoming a teacher but was drawn into the military during the Mexican Revolution after Victoriano Huerta overthrew President Francisco Madero in February 1913, although Michoacán was far from the revolutionary action that had brought Madero to the Mexican presidency. After Huerta's coup and Madero's assassination, Cárdenas joined a group of Zapatistas, but Huerta's forces scattered the group, where Cárdenas had served as captain and paymaster. Given that revolutionary forces were voluntary organizations, his position of leadership points to his skills and his being a paymaster to the perception that he would be honest in financial matters. Both characteristics followed him through his subsequent career. He escaped the Federal forces in Michoacán and moved north, where he served initially with Álvaro Obregón, then Pancho Villa, and after 1915 when Villa was defeated by Obregón to Plutarco Elías Calles, who served Constitutionalist leader Venustiano Carranza. Although Cárdenas was from the southern state of Michoacán, his key experiences in the Revolution were with Constitutionalist northerners, whose faction won. In particular, he served under Calles, who tasked him with military operations against Yaqui Indians and against Zapatistas in Michoacán and Jalisco, during which time he rose to a field command as general. In 1920, after Carranza was overthrown by northern generals, Cárdenas was given the rank of brigadier general at the age of 25. Cárdenas was appointed provisional governor of his home state of Michoacán under the brief presidency of Adolfo de la Huerta.

=== Service under President Calles ===
Cárdenas was a political protégé of Calles, but his ideological mentor was revolutionary General Francisco J. Múgica, a strongly anticlerical, secular socialist. President Calles appointed Cárdenas Chief of Military Operations in the Huasteca, an oil-producing region on the Gulf Coast. Cárdenas saw first-hand the operations of foreign oil companies. In the Huasteca, U.S. oil companies extracted oil, avoided taxes owed to the Mexican government, and treated the region as "conquered territory." Múgica also was posted to the Huasteca and he and Cárdenas became close. During their time in the Huasteca, Múgica told Cárdenas that "socialism [is] the appropriate doctrine for resolving conflicts in Mexico."

=== Governor of Michoacán, 1928–1932 ===
Cárdenas was appointed governor of his home state of Michoacán in 1928, which was undergoing the political conflict between state and Church, known as the Cristero War. His ideological mentor Múgica had previously served as the state's governor and had attempted to counter the power of the Catholic Church in Mexico through laws. He mobilized groups to support his positions, creating "political shock troops," consisting of public school teachers and members of a disbanded agrarian league, forming the Confederación Revolucionaria Michoacana del Trabajo, under the slogan of "Union, Land, Work." The organization was funded by the state government, although not listed as an official expenditure. It became the single-most powerful organization representing both workers and peasants. Mobilizing worker and peasant support and controlling the organization to which they belonged became the model for Cárdenas when he became president.

==== Land reform ====
As governor, Cárdenas also prioritized land reform at a time when President Calles was disillusioned by the program. He expropriated haciendas and created ejidos, collectively held, state-controlled landholdings. Ejiditarios, members of the ejido, worked individual plots of land but did not hold title to it as private property. Opposition to the program came from estate owners (hacendados), the clergy, and in some cases, tenant farmers, but Cárdenas continued land reform programs in his state.

During his four years as governor, Cárdenas initiated a modest re-distribution of land at the state level, encouraged the growth of peasant and labor organizations, and improved education at a time when it was neglected by the federal government. Cárdenas ensured teachers were paid on time, personally inspected schools, and opened one hundred new rural schools. Due to his grassroots style of governing, Cárdenas made important policy decisions based on direct information received from the public rather than on the advice of his confidants.

==== Promotion of tourism, art, and indigenous culture ====
Cárdenas's home "La Quinta Eréndira" in Pátzcuaro

During his term as governor, Cárdenas sought to bring peace to the state, unite its population divided by the on-going Cristero War, and make Michoacán, especially the historic town of Pátzcuaro into a tourist destination. Once he was president of Mexico, he continued to devote government funding to the project. Cárdenas built a house in Pátzcuaro when he became governor of the state, naming it "La Quinta Eréndira," after the Purépecha princess, who has been identified as Mexico's first anticolonial heroine for her resistance to the Spanish conquest, and a contrasting figure to Malinche, Cortés's cultural translator. Eréndira became a popular historical figure under Cárdenas. At his estate, he commissioned murals for the house, which are now lost, but it is known from historical sources that they had indigenous themes, particularly the rise and fall of the Purépecha Empire at the time of the Spanish conquest. The murals and the texts "appropriate national historical narratives in order to supplant the national myths and locate Mexico's ideal foundations in Michoacán."

== 1934 presidential election ==
Logo of the Partido Nacional Revolucionario founded by Plutarco Elías Calles in 1929. The logo has the colors and arrangement of the Mexican flag, with the party's acronym replacing the symbol of the eagle.

Calles tapped Cárdenas to be the party's president. Of the revolutionary generals, Cárdenas was considered "honest, able, anti-clerical, and politically astute." He had come from a poor and marginal state of Mexico, but had risen to political prominence by his military skills on the battlefield and, importantly, by having chosen the correct side of decisive splits since 1913. When he was chosen as the presidential candidate in 1934, no one expected him to be anything other than loyal to Calles, the "Jefe Máximo", and the power behind the presidency since 1929.

As the PNR's candidate, Cárdenas's election was a foregone conclusion. It was politically impossible for his patron, Calles, to serve as president again, but he continued to dominate Mexico after his presidency (1924–28) through "puppet administrations" in a period known as the Maximato. After two of his hand-picked men held office, the PNR balked in 1932 at supporting his first choice, Manuel Pérez Treviño. Instead, they selected Cárdenas as the presidential candidate. Calles agreed, believing he could control Cárdenas as he had controlled his predecessors. Not only had Cárdenas been associated with Calles for two decades, but he had risen politically under Calles's patronage, serving as governor of Michoacán, president of the PNR, and secretary of war and the navy. Cárdenas resigned as secretary of war and the navy on 15 May 1933 and accepted the PNR's nomination on 5 June.

=== Six-Year Plan and presidential campaign ===
Cárdenas ran on the Six Year Plan for social and political reform that the party drafted under Calles's direction. Such a multiyear program was patterned after the just-completed Five Year Plan of the Soviet Union. The Six-Year Plan (to span the presidential term 1934–40) was a patchwork of proposals from a variety of participants, but the driving force behind it was Calles, who had given a speech in May 1933, saying that the "Mexican Revolution had failed in most of its important objectives," and that a plan needed to implement its objectives. Interim President Abelardo L. Rodríguez did not get his cabinet's approval for the plan in 1933 so Calles's next move was to present it in draft form to the party convention. "Rather than a blueprint, the Six-Year Plan was a sales prospectus," and a "hopeless jumble" filled with compromises and contradictions, as well as utopian aspirations. But the direction of the plan was toward renewed reform.

The plan called for

- destruction of the hacienda economy and creation of a collective system of ejidos (common lands) under government control;
- modern secular schools and eradication of the influence of the Catholic Church; and
- workers' cooperatives to oppose the excesses of industrial capitalism.

Assured of the backing of the powerful Calles and a presidential victory, Cárdenas took the opportunity to actively campaign in many parts of Mexico rather than remaining in Mexico City. His 25,000-kilometer campaign accomplished several things, including making direct contact with regions and constituents who had never seen a presidential candidate before and thus building Cárdenas a personal power base. The campaign also allowed him to refine and articulate for popular consumption what he considered the important elements of the Six Year Plan. On the campaign trail, he acted more like someone already in office than a candidate, settling disputes between groups. He reached out to Mexican workers, as well as peasants, to whom he promised land reform. Cárdenas promised indigenous peoples schools and educational opportunities, and urged them to join with workers against exploitative practices.

As expected, Cárdenas won handily, officially winning over 98 percent of the vote, or 2,268,507 votes.

== Presidency (1934–1940) ==
=== Presidential style ===
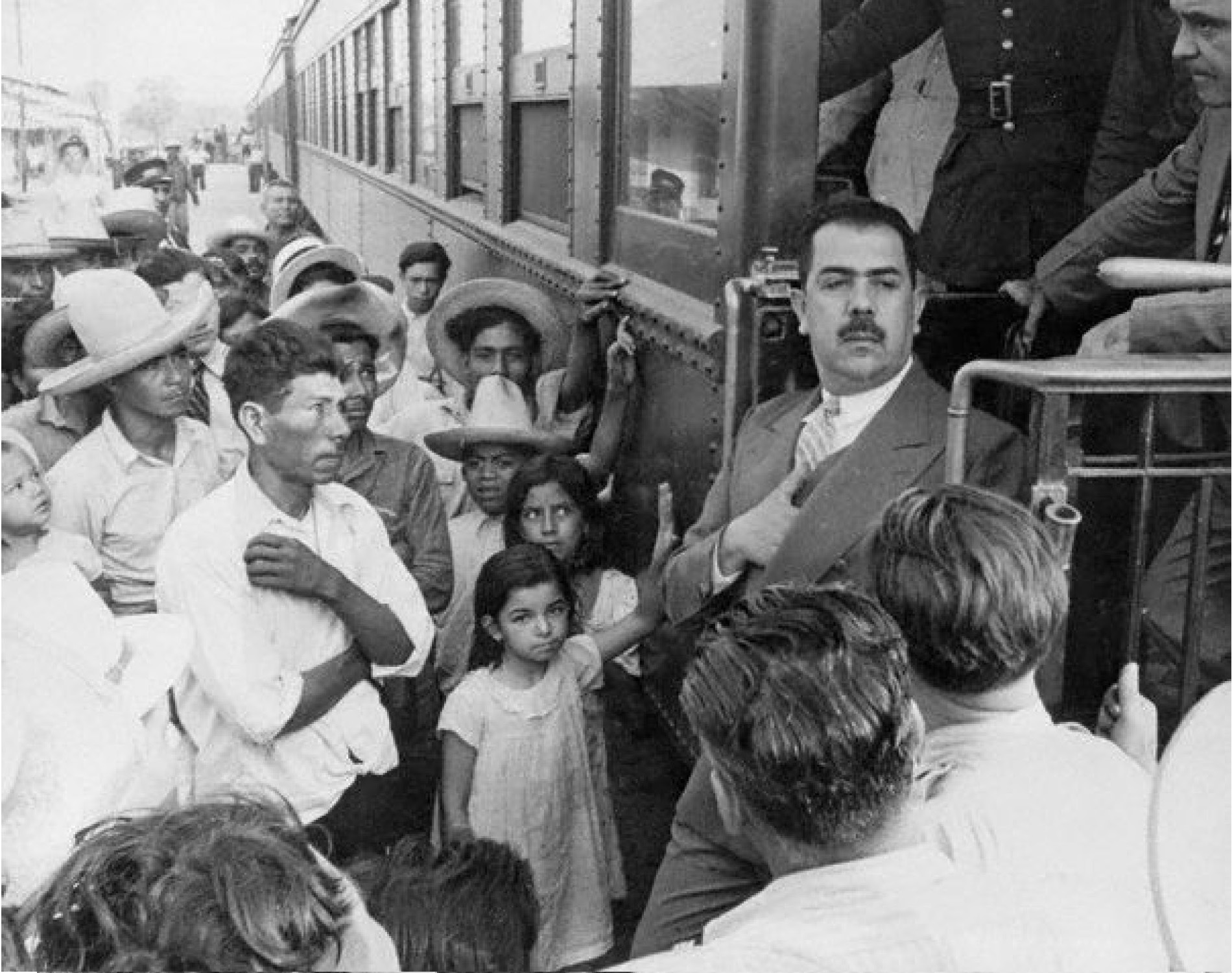
Cárdenas decrees nationalization of foreign railways in 1937.

Cárdenas was inaugurated on 1 December 1934. His first action after taking office was to have his presidential salary cut in half. He became the first occupant of the official presidential residence of Los Pinos, which had been seized from the Martínez del Río family, and he had the previous residence, the ostentatious Chapultepec Castle, converted into the National Museum of History. In a move that struck at the financial interests of his patron Calles's cronies, Cárdenas closed down their gambling casinos and brothels, where "prominent Callistas had invested their profits from bribery and industrial activities."

Unlike many of his predecessors, Cárdenas did not use armored cars or bodyguards for personal protection. During the 1934 presidential campaign he traveled extensively through rural areas by automobile and horseback, accompanied only by his chauffeur and aide-de-camp, Rafael M. Pedrajo. Contemporary observers and later historians have noted that this personal style and willingness to travel with minimal security contributed to his reputation for personal courage and helped generate popular respect.

=== Cabinet ===
Cárdenas's cabinet When he was first in office, his cabinet included Calles family members and loyalists: his oldest son Rodolfo at the Secretariat of Communications and Public Works (1934–1935); Aarón Sáenz Garza, the brother-in-law of Calles's second son, Plutarco Jr. ("Aco"), was appointed the administrator for Mexico City (1934–1935), a cabinet-level position. Others with loyalty to Calles were radical Tomás Garrido Canabal at the Secretariat of Agriculture and Development (1934–1935); Marxist Narciso Bassols held the post of Secretary of Finance and Public Credit (1934–1935); Emilio Portes Gil, who had been interim president of Mexico following the assassination of Obregón but not chosen as the PNR presidential candidate in 1929, held the position of Foreign Secretary (1934–1935). Cárdenas chose his comrade-in-arms and mentor General Francisco José Múgica as Secretary of the National Economy (1934–1935). As Cárdenas began to chart his own course and outflank Calles politically in 1935, he replaced Calles loyalists with his own supporters.

=== Cárdenas and the military ===
As a revolutionary general, Cárdenas followed in the tradition of his immediate predecessors in the presidency who had standing as military leaders but sought to curb the power of the military. Obregón and Calles sought to downsize and professionalize the Mexican military and make it subordinate to the civilian government. Cárdenas's election had not triggered revolts by disgruntled military men with ambitions to the presidency, as had happened in 1923, 1928, and 1929. Much of the military remained loyal to Calles, but Cárdenas had supporters among the army leadership as well. Cárdenas sought to serve as president in his own right, not be a puppet of Calles, and to do that he needed to broaden his base of support. Cárdenas sought to arm the peasantry as a counterpoise to the army, a move that disturbed the more conservative generals. Cárdenas cultivated the loyalty of the junior officer corps, providing better housing, pensions, and schooling for their children.

=== Cárdenas and the Catholic Church ===
Cárdenas repealed the Calles Law soon after he became president in 1934. Cárdenas earned respect from Pope Pius XI and had a close friendship with Mexican Archbishop Luis María Martínez, a major figure in Mexico's Catholic Church who successfully persuaded Mexicans to obey the government's laws peacefully. However, he also implemented educational reforms, particularly socialist education and the elimination of religious schooling. Nevertheless, the Cárdenas administration bridged a gap between church and state, developed a working and friendly relationship with the church, and helped subdue the bitter animosity between Catholics and leftists that had lingered since the Mexican Revolution, with the Holy See eventually supporting Cárdenas in comparison to condemning the militant atheism of Calles. The attempts to make peace with the Catholic Church came in spite of the fact that Cardenas himself was an atheist who even once reportedly said "Man should not put his hope in the supernatural. Every moment spent on one's knees is a moment stolen from humanity."

=== Land reform and the peasantry ===
During Cárdenas's presidency, the government enacted land reform that was "sweeping, rapid, and, in some respects, innovative". He redistributed large commercial haciendas, some 180,000 km^{2} of land to peasants. With the powers of Article 27 of the Mexican constitution, he created agrarian collectives, or ejidos, which in early twentieth-century Mexico were an atypical form of landholding. Two high-profile regions of expropriation for Cárdenas's agrarian reform were in the productive cotton-growing region in northern Mexico, known as La Laguna, and in Yucatán, where the economy was dominated by henequen production. Other areas that saw significant land reform were Baja California and Sonora in northern Mexico, his home state of Michoacán and Chiapas in southern Mexico.

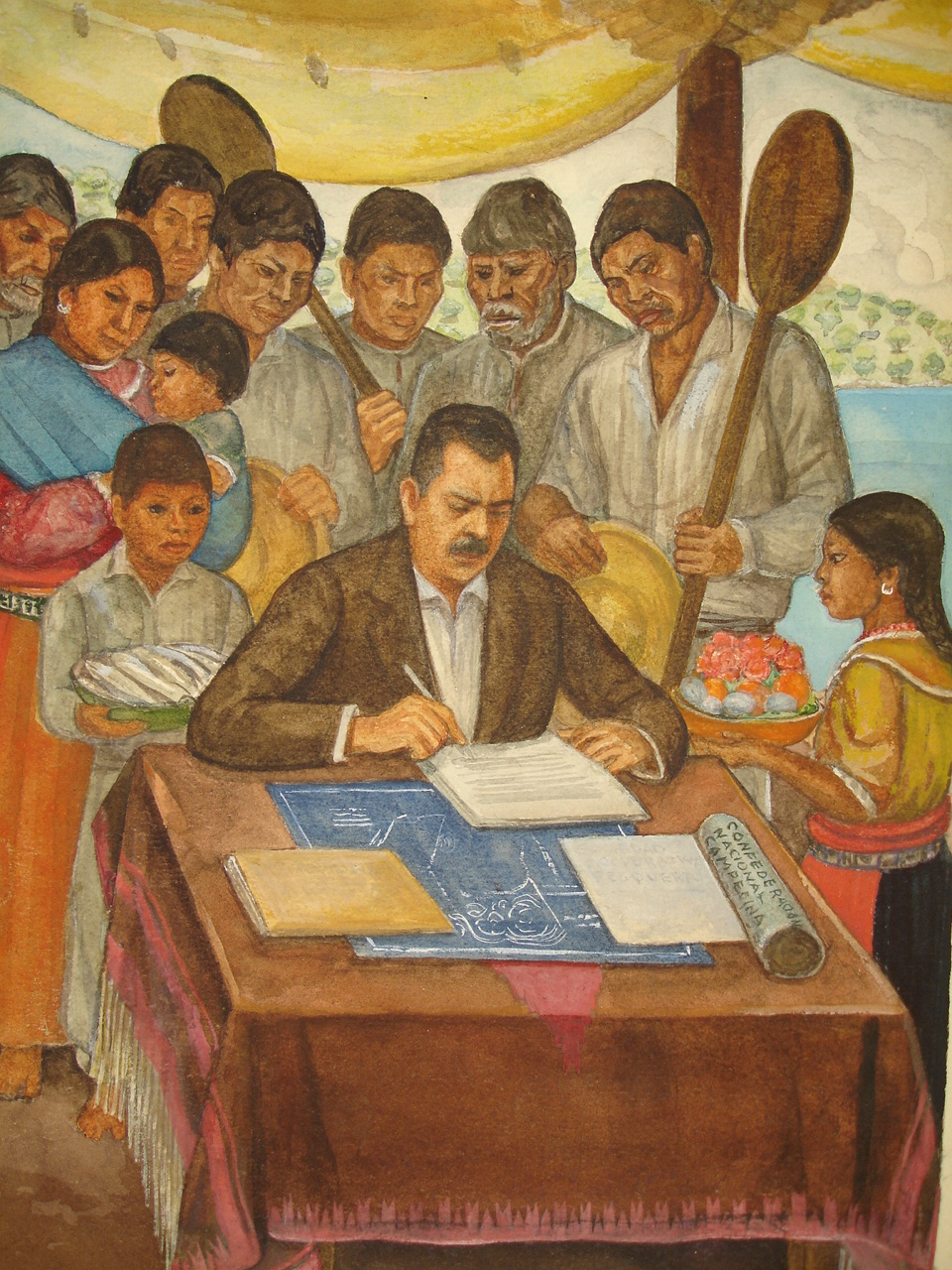
President Cárdenas, with campesinos by Roberto Cueva del Río, watercolor 1937

In 1937, Cárdenas invited Andrés Molina Enríquez, intellectual father of Article 27 of the 1917 Constitution, to accompany him to Yucatán to implement the land reform, even though Molina Enríquez was not a big supporter of the collective ejido system. Although he could not go due to ill health, he defended Cárdenas's action against Luis Cabrera, who argued that the Ejidal Bank that Cárdenas established when he embarked on his sweeping redistribution of land was, in fact, making the Mexican state the new hacienda owner. For Molina Enríquez, the Yucatecan henequen plantations were an "evil legacy" and "hellholes" for the Maya. As a lifelong supporter of land reform, Molina Enríquez's support of Cárdenas's "glorious crusade" was important.

Cárdenas knew that peasant support was important and as a presidential candidate in 1933, he reached out to an autonomous peasant organization, the Liga Nacional Campesina (National Peasant League) and promised to integrate it into the party structure. The Liga split over this question, but one element was integrated into the Partido Nacional Revolucionario. Cárdenas expanded the peasant league's base in 1938 into the Confederación Nacional Campesina (CNC). Cárdenas "believed that an organized peasantry would represent a political force capable of confronting the established landholding elite, as well as providing a critical voting block for the new Mexican state."

Scholars differ as to Cárdenas's intent for the CNC, with some viewing it as an autonomous organization that would advocate for peasants regarding land tenure, rural projects, and peasant political interests, while others see the CNC as in patron-client relationship with the state, restricting its autonomy. The CNC was created with the idea of "peasant unification" and was controlled by the government. Peasants' rights were acknowledged, but peasants were to be responsible allies of the political regime. The radical Confederation of Mexican Workers (CTM) and the Mexican Communist Party (PCM) sought to organize peasants, but Cárdenas asserted the government's right to do that since it was in charge of land reform and warned that their attempting to organize the peasantry would sow dissension.

Cárdenas further strengthened the government's role by creating rural militias or reserves, which armed some 60,000 peasants by 1940, which were under the control of the army. The armed peasantry helped promote political stability against regional strongmen (caudillos). They could ensure that government land reform was accomplished. Peasant reserves could protect recipients of reform against estate owners and break rural strikes that threatened government control.

Agrarian reform took place in a patchwork fashion with uneven results. Over years, many regions had experienced peasant mobilization in the face of repression and "low intensity agrarian warfare." The peasant movement in Morelos had mobilized before the Mexican Revolution and had success under Emiliano Zapata's leadership extinguished the hacienda system in that state. In Cárdenas's agrarian reform, with the revolutionary regime consolidated and agrarian problems still unresolved, the president courted mobilized agraristas, who now found the state attentive to their issue. Land reform, with some exceptions such as in Yucatán, took place in areas of previous mobilization. Peasants themselves pushed for agrarian reform and to the extent it was accomplished, they were integral agents not merely the recipients of top-down state largesse. However, the peasantry was under the control of the national government with no outlet for independent organization or the formation of alliances with Mexican urban workers.

=== Labor ===
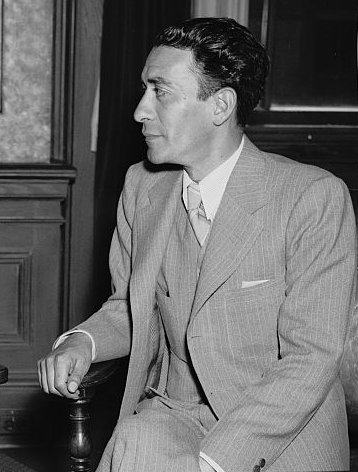
Vicente Lombardo Toledano, socialist leader of the Confederation of Mexican Workers.

The other key sector of reform was industrial labor. Article 123 of the 1917 Constitution had empowered workers in an unprecedented way, guaranteeing human rights such as the minimum wage, an eight-hour workday and the right to strike and form trade unions, but in a more comprehensive fashion, Article 123 signaled that the Mexican state was firmly on the side of workers. A labor organization already existed when Cárdenas took office, the CROM union of Luis Morones. Morones was forced out of his cabinet post in Calles's government and the CROM declined in power and influence, with major defections of Mexico City unions, one of which was led by socialist Vicente Lombardo Toledano. Cárdenas promoted Toledano's "purified" Confederation of Mexican Workers, which evolved into the Mexican Confederation of Workers or CTM. The CTM's alliance with Cárdenas was tactical and conditional, seeing their interests being forwarded by Cárdenas, but not controlled by him. As with the agrarian sector with mobilized peasants, mobilized and organized workers had long agitated and fought for their interests. Article 123 of the Constitution was a tangible result of their participation in the Mexican Revolution on the Constitutionalist side. In fact, workers organized by the Casa del Obrero Mundial, a radical labor organization, fought in the Red Battalions against the peasant revolutionaries led by Emiliano Zapata. Lombardo Toledano and the CTM supported Cárdenas's exile of Calles and in the same stroke Cárdenas also exiled CROM's discredited leader, Luis Napoleón Morones.

Cárdenas nationalized the railway system creating the Ferrocarriles Nacionales de México in 1938 and put under a "workers' administration." His most sweeping nationalization was that of the petroleum industry in 1938.

Various measures affecting labor were also introduced under Cárdenas. A decree was issued "giving binding force throughout the Republic to a collective agreement which establishes a maximum working week of 48 hours for persons employed in sugar-cane plantations, sugar factories (including by-products), and all similar undertakings." In addition, the Factory Inspection Service was instructed by the Federal authorities "to make arrangements to secure regular and effective supervision of working hours and to prevent infringements of the 8-hour day." Under an Act of 20 February 1936 that concerned the payment of wages for the weekly rest day, the State authorities "are free to allow for the special circumstances and needs of each locality when promulgating administrative regulations." An enquiry made by the Department of Labour into silicosis in mines and byssinosis in the cotton industry "led to the adoption of measures to ensure notification and compensation of these diseases." Regulations dealing with general industrial hygiene were issued on the 6th of June 1936. Dust-exhaust apparatus and respirators "were made compulsory for factories using certain raw materials (wool, padding, etc.), and the Federal Department of Public Health issued regulations for the protection of the health of workers in the woollen industry." The Industrial Hygiene Regulations of 6 June 1936 "make it compulsory for factories to establish a medical service." Regulations for the inspection of boilers were laid down on 30 August 1936, while regulations of 25 June 1936 "concerning industrial hygiene provide that the Department of Health must determine the cases in which industrial undertakings are to establish crêches and day nurseries for the children of their workers." The Government also undertook to give effect to Article 123 of the Constitution, which provides "that all agricultural, industrial and mining undertakings shall supply comfortable and healthy living accommodation for their employees." Under an Act of 27 September 1938, which was promulgated on 5 December 1938, "laying down the Federal Civil Servants' Statute, hours of work and other conditions of employment are regulated for all Federal civil servants other than those employed in a confidential capacity." On 21 March 1939, regulations for a maritime inspection service were promulgated.

=== Education ===
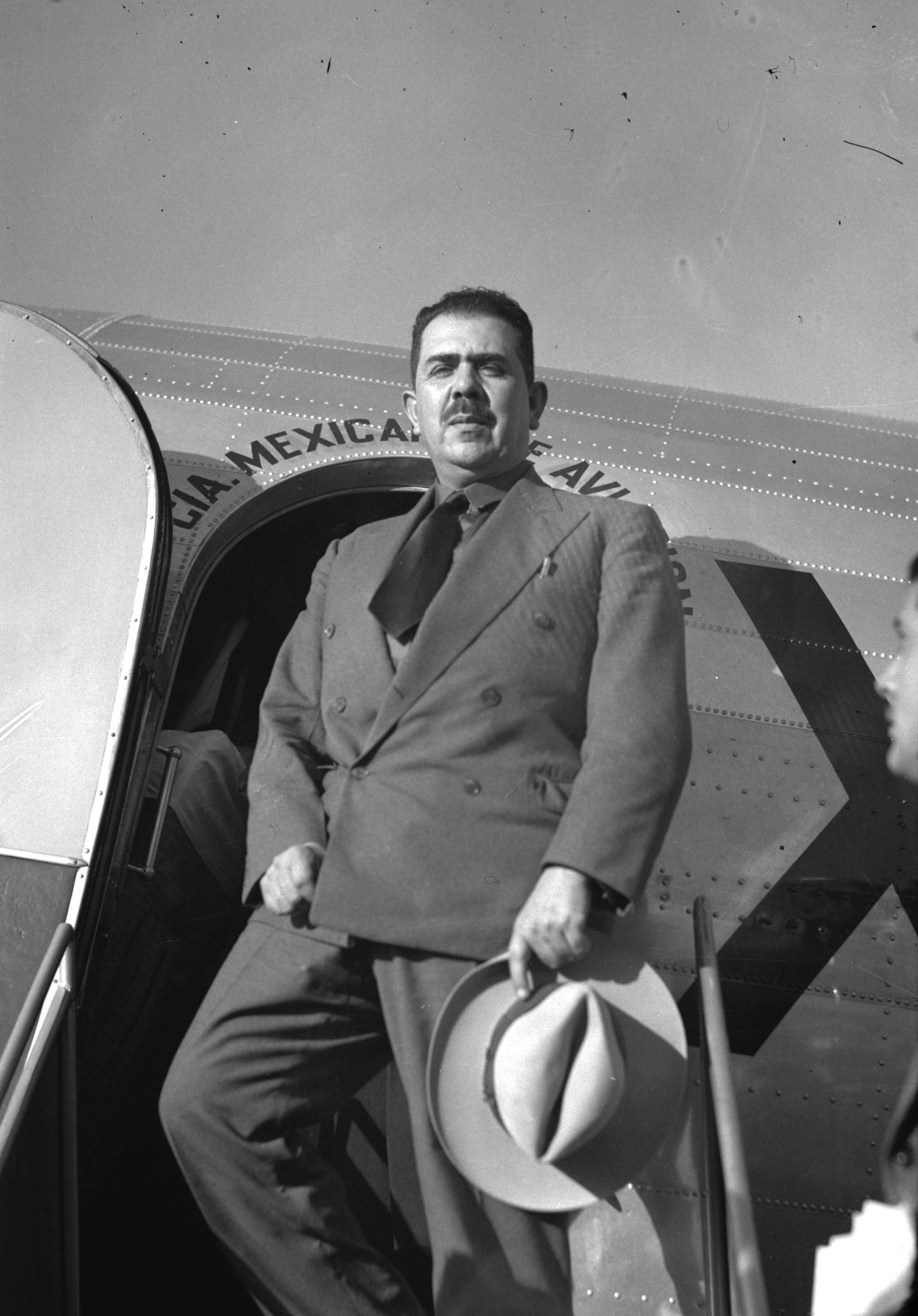
General Lázaro Cárdenas del Río.

During the Calles Maximato, Mexican education policies were directed at curtailing the cultural influence of the Catholic Church by introducing sex education and leftist ideology via socialist education, and generally aiming to create a national civic culture. Cárdenas as a presidential candidate, under the patronage of fierce anticlerical Calles, was in favor of such policies. The opposition to socialist education by the Catholic Church as an institution and rural Catholics in such strongholds as Michoacán, Jalisco, and Durango saw the revival of armed peasant opposition, sometimes known as the Second Cristiada. The extent of the opposition was significant and Cárdenas chose to step back from implementing the radical educational policies, particularly as he became engaged with undermining Calles's power. Cárdenas gained support from the Catholic Church when he distanced himself from anticlerical policies. More funds were also allocated to education during the course of the Cárdenas presidency.

An important addition to higher education in Mexico was when Cárdenas established the Instituto Politécnico Nacional (IPN), a technical university in Mexico City, in the wake of the 1938 oil expropriation to train engineers and scientists.

In 1937 a National Polytechnic Institute was established; offering (as Cárdenas noted in a 1940 message) "opportunities for young people to develop special skills and to prepare themselves for technical and professional careers." A basic Act on Education, which contained detailed provisions on technical and professional training and education, was promulgated on 30 December 1939.

=== Health and Welfare ===
A number of measures aimed at improving health and welfare were carried out under the Cárdenas administration. During the six years of Cárdenas's presidency, water supply systems had been constructed in 337 towns, while health stations and hospitals were established. In 1936, social medicine and rural hygiene services were set up. A nation-wide welfare program was also adopted by the government that included, as Cardenas noted in a 1940 message, "medical assistance, aid to mothers and children, and general social therapy directed toward the education and rehabilitation of socially and economically weak and dependent persons and their eventual re-establishment as useful members of society."

In 1937 the Compania Exportadora e Importadora Mexicana was set up with the aim of providing markets for producers and stabilizing commodity prices for urban workers. The following year the Comite Regulador del Mercado de Subsistencias (CRMS) was set up (as noted by one study) "to better combat shortages, higher prices, and labor demands for higher wages." By 1939, CRMS had opened up retail shops which sold staples such as beans, rice and sugar at 50-75% below market rates.

=== Indigenismo ===
Cárdenas created the new cabinet-level Department of Indigenous Affairs (Departamento de Asuntos Indígenas) in 1936, with Graciano Sánchez, an agrarista leader in charge. After a controversy at the DAI, Sánchez was replaced by a scholar, Prof. Luis Chávez Orozco. Cárdenas was influenced by an advocate of indigenismo, Moisés Sáenz, who earned a doctorate in education from Columbia University and had held a position in the Calles administration in the Secretariat of Public Education (SEP). Although initially an assimilationist for Mexico's indigenous, he shifted his perspective after a period of residence in a Purépecha village, which he published as Carapan: Bosquejo de una experiencia. He came to see indigenous culture as having value. Sáenz advocated for educational and economic reforms that would better the indigenous, and this became the aim of the department Cárdenas created.

The official 1940 government report on the Cárdenas administration states that "the indigenous problem is one of the most serious that the revolutionary government has had to confront." The aim of the department was to study fundamental problems concerning Mexico's indigenous, particularly economic and social conditions, and then propose measures to the executive power for coordinated action to promote and manage measures considered to be in the interests of centers of indigenous populations. Most indigenous people were found in Veracruz, Oaxaca, Chiapas, and Yucatán, according to the 1930 national census. In 1936 and 1937, the department had approximately 100 employees and a budget of $750,000 pesos, but as with other aspects of the Cárdenas regime, 1938 marked a significant increase personnel and budget; 350 employees in 1938 and a budget of $2.77 million pesos and in 1939, the high point in the department's budget, there were 850 employees with a budget of $3.75 million pesos. In 1940, the budget remained robust at $3 million pesos, with 650 employees.

The function of the department was primarily economic and educational. Specifically it was tasked with defending indigenous villages and communities, holders of ejidos (ejidatarios) and indigenous citizens from persecution and abuse that could be committed by any type of authority. It defended ejido officials (comisariados ejidales) and agricultural cooperatives. The goals that the department worked toward were primarily economic and education, with cultural actions second. Social measures and public health/sanitation were less important in terms of action for this department.

The department promoted a series of national indigenous congresses, bringing together different indigenous groups to meet as indigenous and discuss common issues. The government's aim in doing this was to have them move in concert toward the "integral liberation" (liberación integral), with their rights respected by the primary goal was to incorporate indigenous into the larger, national population on an equal basis. Initially in 1936 and 1937, there was one annual conference. The first one drew approximately 300 pueblos, while the second only 75. In 1938, there were two conferences with 950 pueblos represented. The last two years of the Cárdenas sexenio there were two congresses each year, but sparser attendance at around 200 pueblos each. The government attempted to engage the active participation of the indigenous pueblos, seeing that such engagement was the key to success, but the fall-off in the last two years indicates decreased mobilization. The department published 12 edited books with a total publication run of 350 as well as 170 tape recorded materials in indigenous languages.

In February 1940, the department established a separate medical/sanitary section with 4 clinics in Chihuahua and one in Sonora, but the largest number were in central in southern Mexico.

In 1940, the first Interamerican Indigenista Congress met in Pátzcuaro, Michoacán, with Cárdenas giving a plenary address to the participants.

=== Women's suffrage ===
Cárdenas had pushed for women's suffrage in Mexico, responding to the pressure from women activists and from the political climate that emphasized equality of citizens. Mexico was not alone in Latin America in not enfranchising women, but in 1932, both Brazil and Uruguay had extended suffrage to women, and Ecuador had also done so. Women had made a significant contribution to the Mexican Revolution, but had not made gains in the postrevolutionary phase. Women who were members of the Confederación Nacional Campesina (National Peasants Confederation) or the Confederación de Trabajadores Mexicanos (Confederation of Mexican Workers) were, by virtue of their membership umbrella organizations, also members of Cárdenas's reorganized party, the Party of the Mexican Revolution or PRM, done in 1938. In practice, however, women were marginalized from power. Women could not stand for national or local governmental elections or vote. The Constitution of 1917 did not explicitly address women's rights and so to enfranchise women required a constitutional amendment. The amendment itself was simple and brief, specifying that "mexicanos" referred to both women and men.

In 1937, Cárdenas introduced a constitutional amendment to Article 34 that would have granted women full citizenship and voting rights. Many PNR congressmen and senators gave supportive speeches for the amendment, but there was opposition. Cárdenas's impending reorganization of the party, which took place in 1938, was a factor in changing some opponents into supporters. The proposal was approved unanimously by both the Senate (December 1937) and the Chamber of Deputies (July 1938) and was ratified by a majority of state legislatures. It was never published in the Diario Oficial, however, and therefore never entered into force.

Skeptics of women's suffrage were suspicious that conservative Catholic women would take instructions on voting from priests and so undermine the progressive gains of the Revolution. Conservative Catholic women had mobilized during the church-state conflict of the late 1920s, the Cristero Rebellion, giving material aid to Cristero armies, and even forming a secret society, Feminine Brigades of St. Joan of Arc.

The concern about Mexican women taking advice from priests on voting had some foundation in the example of the leftist Spanish Republic of the 1930s. Many Spanish women indeed supported the position of the Catholic Church which was opposed to the republic's anticlerical policies. The Spanish Civil War served for many Mexican revolutionary leaders as a cautionary tale of the vulnerability of a leftist regime.

Although Cárdenas publicly and repeatedly expressed support for women's suffrage and articulated an egalitarian justification for it, the reform was ultimately blocked. Historians attribute the failure primarily to political calculations within the regime. Revolutionary leaders, including those around Cárdenas, feared that most Mexican women remained under the influence of the Catholic Church and would vote for conservative or opposition candidates, particularly in the contested 1940 presidential election. Catholic women's organizations were widely viewed as better organized and more numerous than feminist groups, creating a perceived risk to the revolutionary project.

Cárdenas shifted positions on the issue several times between 1937 and 1939; while he is generally credited with genuine support in principle, scholars conclude that his administration made the final decision to prevent the reform from taking effect before the 1940 election. Women did not receive the federal vote until 1953, when the Mexican government was pursuing economic policies friendlier to business and there was a modus vivendi with the Catholic Church in Mexico.

=== Legalization of drugs ===
During the last years of his mandate, Cárdenas impulsed groundbreaking drug policy reforms in the country, assisted by Leopoldo Salazar Viniegra who was head of the Drugs authority in the Department of Public Health (departamento de salubridad pública). Salazar's scientific investigations and writings served as the intellectual foundation for Lázaro Cárdenas's Reglamento Federal de Toxicomanías (English: Federal Regulation on Drug Addictions), signed into law on 5 January 1940.

The law decriminalized sales and purchases of small quantities of drugs, eliminating former punishments for drug offenses. In addition, drug users jailed for small criminal drug offenses were released. The law also in effect created a legal way of access to psychoactive drugs for non-medical purposes, and attempted to guarantee medical attention to people addicted to drugs by authorizing medical professionals to prescribe and administer narcotic drugs. The government allocated funds to create a special budget for clinics or dispensaries to open up in order to effectively treat patients by administering controlled doses of low-cost, safe, quality drugs. Patients were required to officially register with clinics in order to receive treatment. Around six clinics were set up around Mexico City. Around 200 people—as many as 1,000, according to some estimates—attended the clinics daily. The state-controlled monopoly on drugs made it so they could provide high quality drugs at a low cost, and much lower and safer than what was sold on the streets of Mexico City at the time.

The law was in effect for about 5 months when, on July 3, 1940, the Mexican government repealed the Reglamento in a decree published in the Diario Oficial de la Federación. The formal government explanation attributed this decision to a shortage of resources and the inability to purchase drugs from Europe due to World War II. Not mentioned in the official declaration were the increasing economic and political pressures from the U.S. to repeal the law.

=== Partido de la Revolución Mexicana ===
Logo of the PRM, based on the logo of its predecessor the Partido Nacional Revolucionario that used the colors of the Mexican flag as its symbol. Cárdenas's PRM created formal sectoral representation within the party structure, including one for the Mexican military. The sectoral structure was retained when the party became the PRI in 1946.

The Partido de la Revolución Mexicana (PRM) came into being on March 30, 1938, after the party founded in 1929 by Calles, the Partido Nacional Revolucionario (PNR), was dissolved. Cárdenas's PRM was reorganized again in 1946 as the Institutional Revolutionary Party. Calles founded the PNR in the wake of President-elect Obregón's assassination in order to create some way for revolutionary leaders to maintain order and power. Calles could not be re-elected as president, but did hold power through the newly created party. Often called the "official party", it "was created as a cartel to control localized political machines and interests."

When Cárdenas ran as the candidate of the PNR in 1934, Calles had expected to continue to be the real power in Mexico. Cárdenas might have been one of the short-term, powerless presidents of the years 1929–1934, but instead he built a large and mobilized base of support of industrial workers and peasants and forced Calles into exile in 1935. Cárdenas further consolidated power by dissolving the PNR and creating a new party with a completely different kind of organization.

Although Congress was dominated by Callistas early in his term, Cárdenas persuaded congressmen to his side, “to the point that he commanded a majority in the Chamber.” As noted by one study, “when Calles began to criticize agrarian and labor agitation and pressure the government to moderate its policies in mid-1935, Cardenas purged his cabinet of Calles’s most loyal supporters. This action demonstrated that the power of the Jefe Máximo was more apparent than real. In its wake, Cardenistas took over the PNR, Congress, and the governments of 14 states.” As noted by another study, “Calles left the country and the Cardenista blocs in the Union Congress became the majority.”

The PRM was organized in four sectors: industrial labor, peasants, a middle-class sector (composed largely of government workers), and the military. This organization was a resurrection of corporatism, essentially organization by estates or interest groups. Each sector of the party had a parallel organization, so that the labor sector was composed of the Confederation of Mexican Workers (CTM), the peasant sector by the National Confederation of Campesinos (CNC), and the middle-class sector by the Federation of Unions of Workers in Service to the State (FSTSE), created in 1938. The old Federal Army had been destroyed in the Revolution and the post-revolutionary military had increasingly been transformed from a collection of veteran revolutionary fighters into a military organized along more traditional lines of hierarchy and control.

The military had in most of Latin America in the post-independence period viewed itself as the arbiter of power and intervened in politics by force or the threat of force. In the post-revolutionary period, presidents of Mexico, including Cárdenas, were former generals in the revolutionary army. Curbing the power of the military was instigated by Álvaro Obregón and Calles, but the threat of revolt and undermining of the state remained, as the Cristero Rebellion showed in the late 1920s, led by a former revolutionary general, Enrique Gorostieta. Cárdenas aimed to undermine the military's potential to dominate politics by making it a sector of the official party. Although some critics questioned the military's incorporation into the party, Cárdenas saw it as a way to assert civilian control over the armed forces. He is quoted as saying, "We did not put the Army in politics. It was already there. In fact it had been dominating the situation, and we did well to reduce its voice to one in four." Cárdenas had already mobilized workers and peasants into a counterweight to the "military's domination of politics."

These groups often had different interests, but rather than creating a pluralist system in which the groups competed, the corporatist model placed the President as the arbiter of interests. Thus, the organization of different interest groups with formal representation in the party gave them access to largesse from the State, but also limited their ability to act autonomously since they were dependents of the new system.

The corporatist model is most often associated with fascism, whose rise in Germany and Italy in the 1930s coincided with Cárdenas's presidency. Cárdenas was emphatically opposed to fascism and supported the Spanish Republic during the Spanish Civil War, receiving Republican refugees and maintaining a firm anti-fascist foreign policy. Nonetheless, he created the PRM and organized the Mexican state on authoritarian lines. That reorganization can be seen as the enduring legacy of the Cárdenas presidency. Although the PRM was reorganized into the Institutional Revolutionary Party in 1946, the basic structure was retained. Cárdenas's calculation that the military's incorporation into the PRM would undermine its power was essentially correct, since it disappeared as a separate sector of the party, but was absorbed into the "popular" sector.

=== 1938 oil expropriation ===
PEMEX logo

Cárdenas had had dealings with the oil industry in the Huasteca in his capacity as a military commander. Ongoing issues with the foreign-owned companies and the Mexican petroleum workers' organization became increasingly tense. Early in his presidency, he declared that a previous agreement between companies and the government "was not in harmony with the basic principle of Article 27 of the Constitution." In 1936, the 18,000-member oil workers' union forced oil companies to sign the first-ever collective bargaining agreement. The union demanded 26 million pesos, the companies offered 12 million. Giving more force to Mexican workers' demands, Cárdenas set up the National Oil Administration and the government's Council of Conciliation and Arbitration took jurisdiction over the wage dispute. The Council supported the workers' demands, which the companies refused to pay. To put even more force into the government's position, it cancelled oil concessions dating to the Porfirato. This move was unprecedented in the history of foreign oil in Mexico. Management and high-skilled workers were all foreigners, so the companies thought that nationalization would be a rash move for Mexico. The companies appealed the government's decision to force companies to pay their wages to the Mexican Supreme Court, which ruled against them on 1 March 1938. Cárdenas was ready to act. Cárdenas tasked his old ally, Francisco J. Múgica, with writing the declaration to the nation about expropriation. On 18 March 1938, Cárdenas nationalized Mexico's petroleum reserves and expropriated the equipment of the foreign oil companies in Mexico. The announcement inspired a spontaneous six-hour parade in Mexico City and was followed by a national fundraising campaign to help compensate the private companies.

The legislation for nationalization provided compensation for the expropriated assets, but Cárdenas's action angered the international business community and Western governments, especially the United Kingdom. The Mexican government was more worried about the lack of technical expertise within the nation to run the refineries. Before leaving, the oil companies removed or destroyed much of the technical documentation and spare parts, hoping to force Cárdenas to accept their conditions.

Mexico was eventually able to restart the oil fields and refineries, but production did not rise to pre-nationalization levels until 1942, after the entry of the United States into World War II. The US sent technical advisers to Mexico to ensure production could support the overall Allied war effort.

In 1938, the British severed diplomatic relations with Cárdenas's government and boycotted Mexican oil and other goods. An international arbitration process ultimately upheld Mexico’s right to nationalize while determining the amount of compensation owed. With the outbreak of World War II, oil became a highly sought-after commodity. The company that Cárdenas founded, Petróleos Mexicanos (or Pemex), later served as a model for other nations seeking greater control over their oil and natural gas resources. For decades after its creation, Pemex revenues constituted the largest single source of government income for Mexico. Cárdenas founded the National Polytechnic Institute to ensure the education and training of people to run the oil industry.

=== Spanish Civil War and refugees in Mexico ===
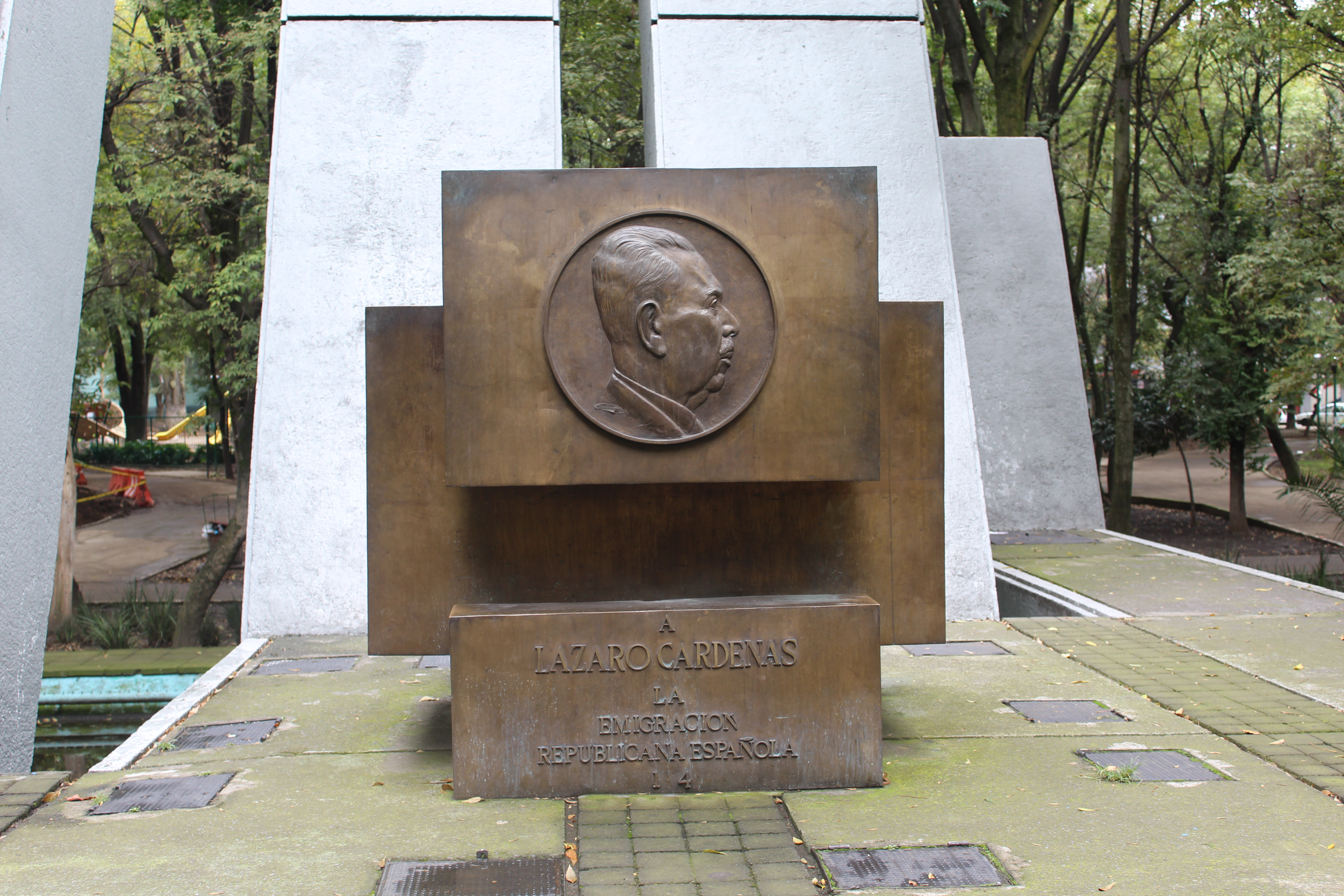
Monument to Lázaro Cárdenas in Parque España, Mexico City

Cárdenas supported the Republican government of Spain against right-wing general Francisco Franco's forces during the Spanish Civil War. Franco was given support by Germany and Italy. Mexico's support of the Republican government was "by selling arms to the Republican army, underwriting arms purchases from third parties, supporting the Republic in the League of Nations, providing food, shelter and education for children orphaned during the Spanish Civil War." Although Mexico's efforts in the Spanish Civil War were not enough to save the Spanish Republic, it did provide a place of exile for as many as 20,000-40,000 Spanish refugees. Among those who reached Mexico were distinguished intellectuals who left a lasting imprint on Mexican cultural life. The range of refugees may be seen from an analysis of the 4,559 passengers arriving in Mexico in 1939 on board the ships Sinaia, Ipanema and Mexique; the largest groups were technicians and qualified workers (32%), farmers and ranchers (20%), along with professionals, technicians, workers, business people students and merchants, who represented 43% of the total. The Casa de España, founded with Mexican government support in the early 1930s, was an organization to provide a haven for Spanish loyalist intellectuals and artists. It became the Colegio de México in October 1940, an elite institution of higher education in Mexico, with the support of Cárdenas's government.

In 1936, Cárdenas allowed Russian exile Leon Trotsky to settle in Mexico, reportedly to counter accusations that Cárdenas was a Stalinist. Cárdenas was not as left-wing as Trotsky and other socialists would have wished, but Trotsky praised his government, describing it as one of the few honest administrations in the world.

=== Relations with Latin America ===
Mexico's most important relations with foreign countries during the Cárdenas presidency was the United States, but Cárdenas attempted to influence fellow Latin American nations viable formal diplomatic efforts in Cuba, Chile, Colombia, and Peru, especially in the cultural sphere. Mexico sent artists, engineers, and athletes as goodwill efforts. No Latin American country emulated Cárdenas's radical policies in the agrarian sector, education, or economic nationalism.

=== Other presidential actions ===
The development bank Nacional Financiera was founded during his term as president. Although not extensively active during that period, in the post-World War II era of the Mexican Miracle, the bank was an important tool in government industrialization projects.

Early in Cárdenas's presidency, a new law aimed at facilitating access to credit was promulgated. A new Bureau of Indian Affairs was also established, together with a Workers’ Industrial Promotion Bank, with the aim of encouraging cooperative societies and industrial organizations controlled by workers. Also, during the first four years of the Cárdenas presidency, 170,000,000 pesos were invested in institutions providing easy credit to workers, farmers, ejidal communities etc.

Cárdenas became known for his progressive program of building roads and schools and promoting education, gaining Congressional approval to allocate twice as much federal money to rural education as all his predecessors combined.

Cárdenas ended capital punishment (in Mexico, usually in the form of a firing squad). Capital punishment has been banned in Mexico since that time. The control of the republic by Cárdenas and the PRI (Partido Revolucionario Institucional) predecessor Partido de la Revolución Mexicana without widespread bloodshed effectively signaled the end of rebellions that began with the 1910 Mexican Revolution. Despite Cárdenas's policy of socialist education, he also improved relations with the Roman Catholic Church during his administration.

=== Failed Saturnino Cedillo revolt, 1938–1939 ===
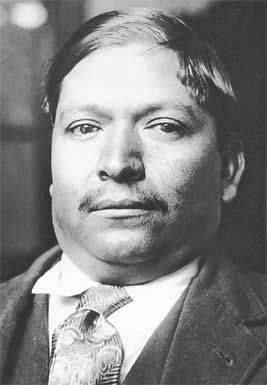
Saturnino Cedillo, revolutionary general and post-revolutionary cacique

The last military major revolt in Mexico was that of Saturnino Cedillo, a regional caudillo and former revolutionary general whose power base was in the state of San Luis Potosí. Cedillo was a supporter of Calles and had participated in the formation of the Partido Nacional Revolucionario. He was a "paradigmatic figure," acting as a strongman in his region and mediating between the federal government and his local power base. As a powerbroker with demonstrated military and political skills, he had a great deal of autonomy in San Luis Potosí, serving a term as governor (1927–32), but then modeling Calles's Maximato was the power behind the governorship. Cedillo supported Cárdenas in his power struggle with Calles. However, relations between Cedillo and Cárdenas soured, particularly as Cárdenas's new political system was consolidated and undermined the autonomous power of local caciques.

Cárdenas was ideologically more radical than Cedillo, and Cedillo became a major figure in right-wing opposition to Cárdenas. Groups around him included the fascist “Gold Shirts”, seen as a force capable of ousting Cárdenas. Cedillo rose in revolt in 1938 against Cárdenas, but the federal government had clear military superiority and crushed the uprising. In 1939, Cedillo, members of his family, and a number of supporters were killed, Cedillo himself was betrayed by a follower while he was in hiding. He was “the last of the great military caciques of the Mexican Revolution who maintained his own quasi-private army,” and who constructed “his campesino fiefdom.” Cárdenas's victory over Cedillo showed the power and consolidation of the newly reorganized Mexican state, but also a showdown between two former revolutionary generals in the political sphere.

=== Other political opposition to Cárdenas ===
There was more organized and ideological opposition to Cárdenas. Right-wing political groups opposed Cárdenas's policies, including the National Synarchist Union (UNS), a popular, pro-Catholic, quasi-fascist movement founded in 1937 that opposed his "atheism" and collectivism. Catholic, pro-business conservatives founded the National Action Party (PAN) in 1939, which became the principal opposition party in later years and won the presidency in 2000.

=== Presidential election of 1940 ===
In the elections of 1940, Cárdenas, hoping to prevent another uprising or even "an outright counter-revolution throughout the Republic" by those opposed to his leftist policies, endorsed the PRM nominee Manuel Ávila Camacho, a moderate conservative. Obregonista Francisco Múgica would have been Cárdenas's ideological heir, and he had played an important role in the Revolution, the leader of the left-wing faction that successfully placed key language in the Constitution of 1917, guaranteeing the rights of labor. Múgica had known Cárdenas personally since 1926 when the two were working in Veracruz. Múgica had served in Cárdenas's cabinet as Secretary of the National Economy and as Secretary of the Ministry of Communications and Public Works. In those positions, Múgica made sure the federal government pursued social goals; Múgica was considered "the social conscience of Cardenismo." Múgica resigned his cabinet post to be a candidate for the 1940 presidential election.

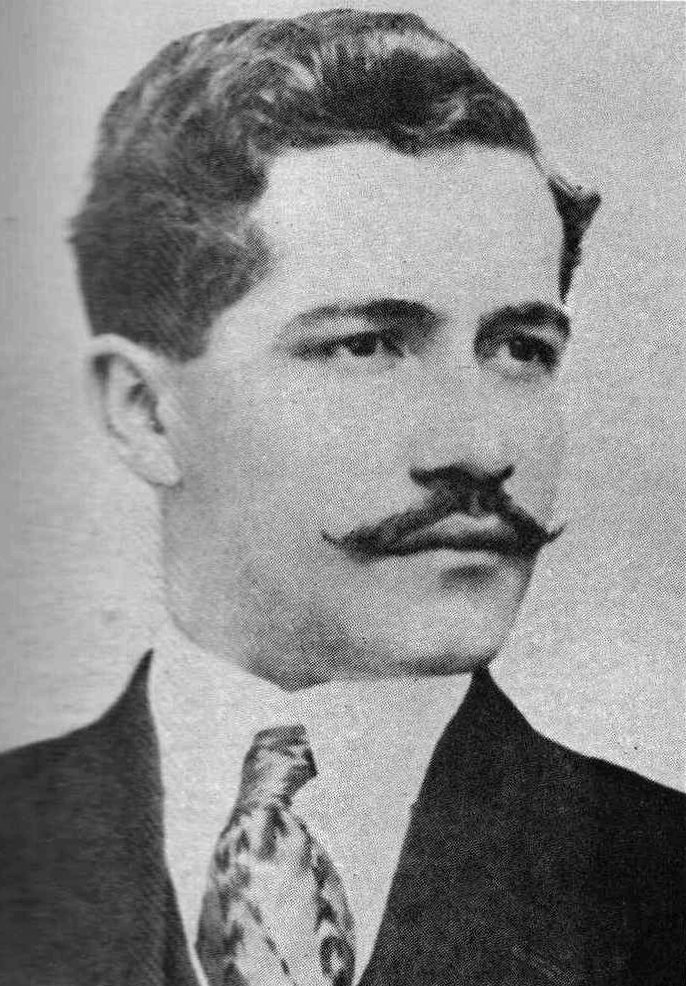
Juan Andreu Almazán, revolutionary general and presidential candidate

However, the political system was not one of open competition among candidates, although the PRM's rules required an open convention to select the candidate. Cárdenas established the unwritten rule that the president chose his successor. Cárdenas chose political unknown Manuel Ávila Camacho, far more centrist than Múgica, as the PRM's official candidate. He was "known as a conciliator rather than a leader" and later derided as "the unknown soldier." Múgica withdrew, realizing his personal ambitions would not be satisfied, and went on to hold other posts in the government. Cárdenas may well have hoped Ávila Camacho would salvage some of his progressive policies and be a compromise candidate compared to his conservative opponent, General Juan Andreu Almazán. Cárdenas is said to have secured the support of the CTM and the CNC for Ávila Camacho by personally guaranteeing their interests would be respected. Cárdenas's followers maintained a degree of representation in the new government, with Camacho naming Cardenistas “to head the ministries that mattered most to Mexican workers and to leftist ideologues.”

The campaign and elections were marked by violent incidents; on election-day the opposing parties hijacked numerous polling places and each issued their own "election results". Cárdenas himself was unable to vote on election day because the polling place closed early to prevent supporters of Almazán from voting. Since the government controlled the electoral process, the official results declared Ávila Camacho as winner; Almazán cried fraud and threatened revolt, trying to set up a parallel government and congress. Ávila Camacho crushed Almazán's forces and assumed office on December 1, 1940. His inauguration was attended by US Vice President-elect Henry A. Wallace, who was appointed by the U.S. as a "special representative with the rank of Ambassador Extraordinary and Plenipotentiary" for Mexico, indicating that the U.S. recognized the legitimacy of the election results. Almazán also attended Ávila Camacho's inauguration.

Much to the surprise of Mexicans who expected that Cárdenas might follow the example of Calles and remain the power behind the presidency, particularly since Ávila Camacho did not appear to have major leadership skills at a time that the conflict in Europe and domestic turmoil were in evidence,he set the important precedent of leaving the presidency and its powers to his successor. Unlike Calles, who had continued to dominate successive administrations during the Maximato, Cárdenas withdrew from day-to-day political control after 1940, allowing Ávila Camacho to govern independently and thereby reinforcing the principle of a single six-year presidential term without a continuing “jefe máximo.”

== Post-presidency ==
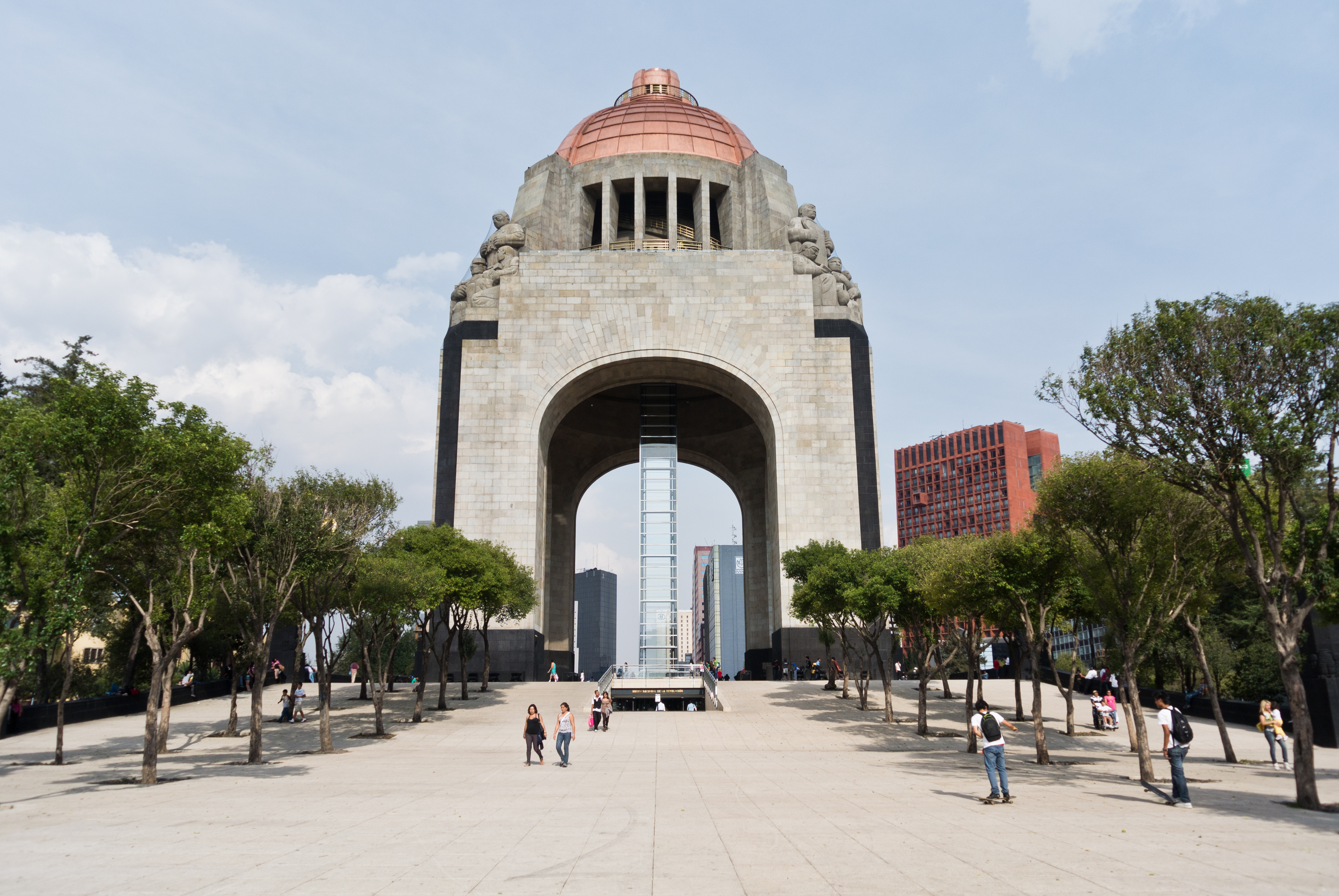
Monument to the Revolution, where Cárdenas is buried along with revolutionary leaders.

=== World War II ===
After leaving office on 1 December 1940, Cárdenas once again served as Mexico’s Minister of War from 1942 to 1945. Mexico had declared war on the Axis powers in May 1942 following the sinking of Mexican oil tankers by German U-boats. As minister, Cárdenas oversaw the country’s limited but symbolically important military contribution to the Allied effort. This included the training and deployment of the Mexican Expeditionary Air Force, which flew combat missions in the Philippines in 1945 under U.S. command, as well as the expansion of coastal defenses, the monitoring of Axis nationals, and the coordination of raw-material exports that supported the Allied war economy.

His appointment was widely seen as a gesture that reassured Mexican wary of a close wartime alliance with the United States. Cárdenas maintained a low public profile in the post and avoided using the position to rebuild personal political power. He left the defense ministry in 1945 once the war in Europe and the Pacific had ended.

=== Support of the Cuban Revolution ===
He strongly supported the Cuban Revolution both before and after its triumph. While Fidel Castro and other members of the 26th of July Movement were preparing their expedition in Mexico in 1955–1956, Cárdenas interceded with President Adolfo Ruiz Cortines to secure their release after they were arrested by Mexican authorities. According to the memoirs of his wife, Amalia Solórzano, he had known the group before their arrest, assisted them, and arranged for them to conduct military training on properties in Michoacán. Local accounts from Uruapan and the tierra caliente of Michoacán corroborate that training took place under his protection. After the triumph of the Revolution he traveled to Havana in July 1959 and appeared with Castro at a mass rally; upon his return he urged a revival of revolutionary social policies in Mexico.

In 1961 he helped organize the Latin American Conference for National Sovereignty, Economic Emancipation and Peace, held in Mexico City, which gathered Latin American nationalists and leftists in support of the Cuban Revolution. That same year he co-founded the Movement of National Liberation (MLN), a broad left-wing organization that became the main political vehicle of his post-presidency activism. This made the administration of Adolfo López Mateos wairy of domestic unrest and ordered surveillance of Cárdenas.

During the Bay of Pigs invasion in April 1961, Cárdenas attempted to travel to Cuba to participate in its defense. Mexican Federal Judicial Police reports of 17 April recorded that he held reservations for a Havana flight that day, spent hours at the Mexico City airport trying to arrange transport after commercial flights were suspended, and told reporters he condemned the invasion as a crime by “Yankee imperialism” and was going precisely because of it; he did not succeed in leaving until later that year.

=== Later years and limited influence ===
He retired to a modest home near Lake Pátzcuaro, Michoacán, where he supervised irrigation projects and promoted free clinics and rural education. Contemporary and later observers frequently described him as one of the few PRI-associated presidents who did not use the office for personal enrichment. He remained publicly active on international issues, opposing the Vietnam War and participating in the 1966 Russell Tribunal.

His influence on later presidents was real but limited. He opposed Miguel Alemán’s 1946 candidacy and later attempts at re-election, helped block constitutional changes that would have allowed a second term, and pressed Adolfo López Mateos toward more left-leaning measures in the early 1960s. López Mateos became increasingly hostile to Cárdenas, and is quoted with telling him that “the Communists are weaving a dangerous web around you." The administration eventually responded with some land, education, and social-program initiatives, after which Cárdenas moderated his public criticism and supported López Mateos's designated successor in 1964, Gustavo Díaz Ordaz, his Minister of the Interior. In 1964, he attended Díaz Ordaz's inauguration.

=== Student movement of 1968 ===
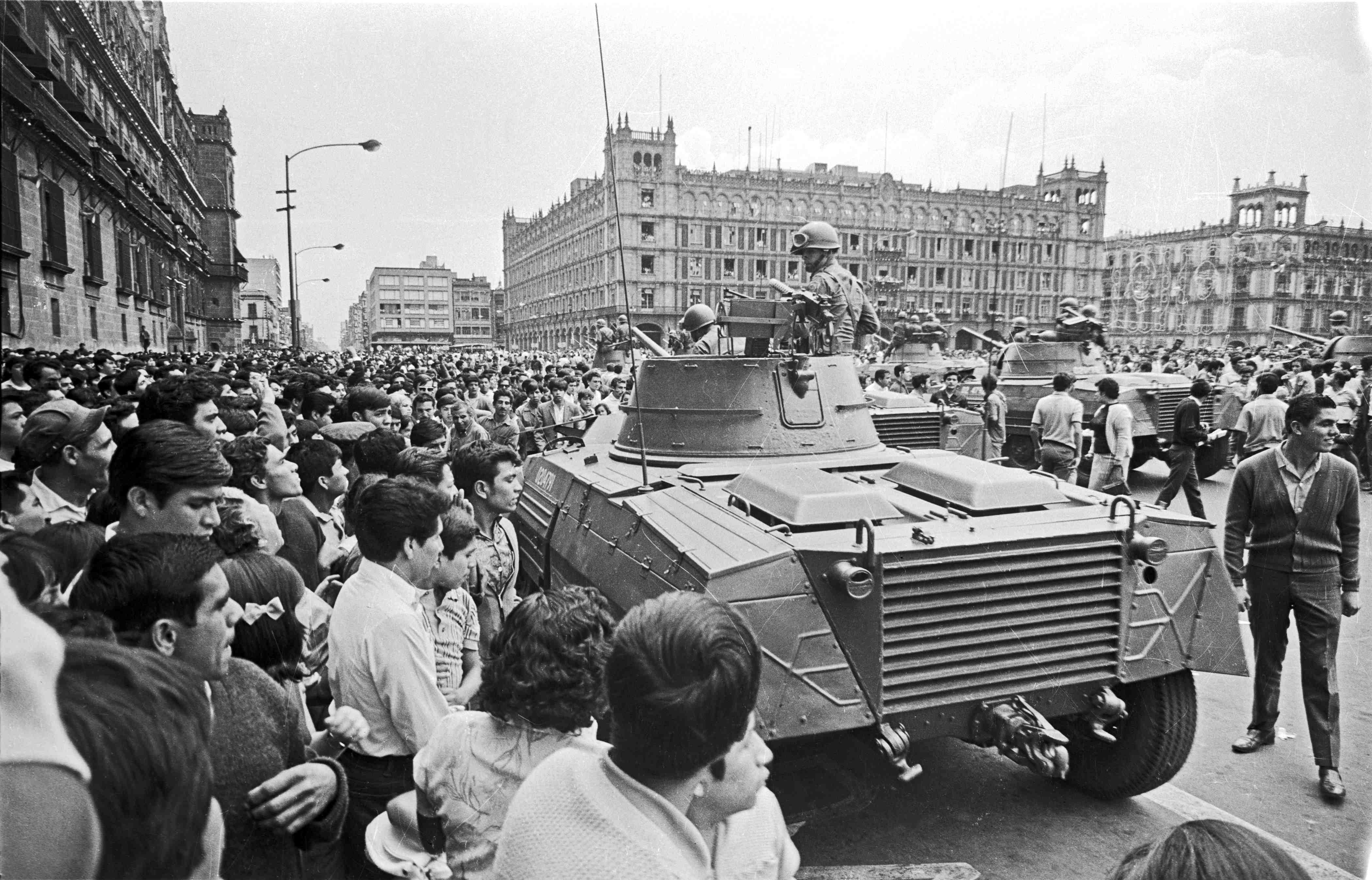
Tanks in the Zócalo during the Mexican Movement of 1968

1968 saw the emergence of the Mexican Movement of 1968, which mobilized tens of thousands of students and middle class supporters during the summer and early fall 1968. The movement ended in the bloody Tlatelolco massacre on 2 October 1968. During the troubles that summer, one of Cárdenas's long-time friends, Heberto Castillo, a professor of mechanical engineering at the National University, actively participated in the movement and was pursued by Díaz Ordaz's secret police. Cárdenas expressed concern and hosted meetings with student leaders. In October, government troops fired on demonstrators at the Plaza of the Three Cultures in Tlatelolco, someone who had been there made his way to Cárdenas's house to tell him in tears what happened. Cárdenas's wife Amalia reportedly said, "And I believe that the General shed some tears too."

=== Death ===
Cárdenas died of lung cancer in Mexico City on 19 October 1970 at the age of 75. He is buried in the Monument to the Revolution in Mexico City, sharing his final resting place with Venustiano Carranza, Pancho Villa, and Plutarco Elias Calles.

== Honors ==
In his honor, his name was given to a number of cities, towns, and a municipality in Mexico, including Lázaro Cárdenas, Michoacán, the municipality of Lázaro Cárdenas, Quintana Roo, Lázaro Cárdenas, Jalisco, and other smaller communities. A major dam project on the Nazas River named for him was inaugurated in 1946. There are also many streets that have been named after him, including the Eje Central Lázaro Cárdenas in Mexico City and highways in Guadalajara, Monterrey and Mexicali. Šetalište Lazaro Kardenasa (Lázaro Cárdenas promenade) in Belgrade, Serbia, is also named after him, as is a street in Barcelona, Spain, and a monument in a park in Madrid dedicated to his memory for his role in admitting defeated Spanish Republicans to Mexico after the Civil War in that country. In Chicago, Lazaro Cardenas K-8 School in the Mexican neighborhood of Little Village is named after him.

In 1955, Lázaro Cárdenas was one of several recipients that year of the Stalin Peace Prize, awarded to foreigners politically sympathetic to the Soviet Union. The prize was later renamed for Lenin as part of de-Stalinization.

A station in the Mexico City Metro was named after him.

== Legacy ==
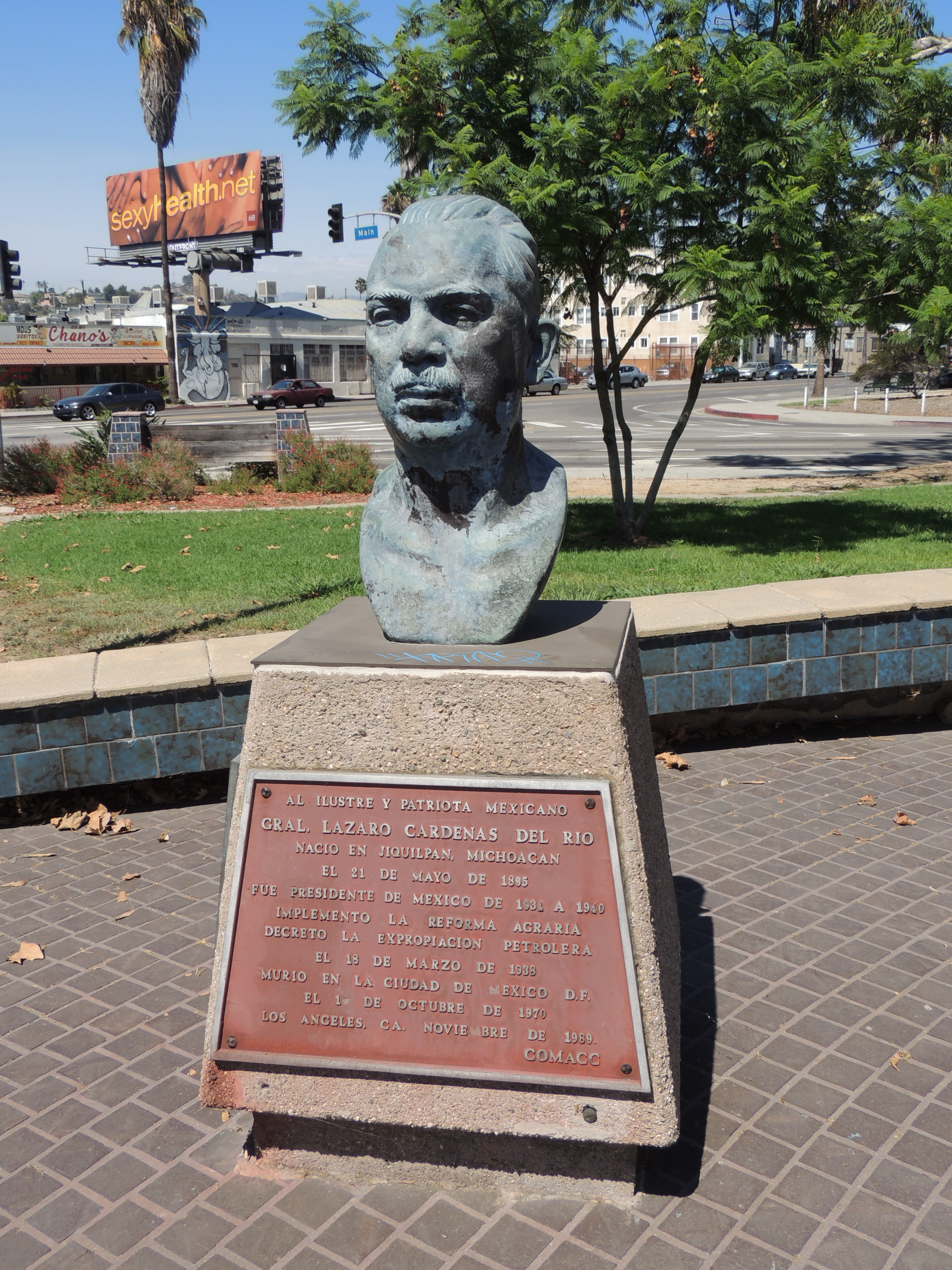
The Bust of Lázaro Cárdenas in Los Angeles, California.

National memory has long portrayed Cárdenas as the moral conscience of the Revolution, the honest revolutionary who carried out land reform, oil nationalization, and rural education without enriching himself. Enrique Krauze has described him in the post-presidency as “an icon, a kind of moral Jefe Máximo, the only true living Mexican Revolutionary.”

Critical scholarship presents a more complex picture. While acknowledging the scale of the 1934–1940 reforms, historians note that Cárdenas’s corporatist reorganization of the party supplied the institutional framework for the long PRI hegemony that lasted until 2000, and that many of his radical measures were later moderated or reversed. In his own 1969 “Political Testament” he acknowledged the persistence of corruption and inequality. The gap between the popular myth of the incorruptible “Tata Lázaro” and the institutional outcomes of his presidency remains a central theme in modern historiography.

The political and ideological current known as Cardenismo outlived him. After his death, the Mexican left repeatedly invoked his name and the memory of the 1934–1940 reforms as a model of nationalist, redistributive government. His son, Cuauhtémoc Cárdenas, became the most visible heir of this tradition: he broke with the PRI in the 1980s, led the National Democratic Front in the disputed 1988 election, and later founded the Party of the Democratic Revolution (PRD). The family’s political role has thus extended the Cárdenas name across nearly a century of Mexican politics, from the radical 1930s to the democratic transition of the late twentieth century.

Scholar Salvador Novo summed up Cárdenas's particular importance:

Cárdenas is a mysterious president. He announces no plans, reveals no projects, travels without a detailed itinerary, delivers marvelous speeches when least expected, solves conflicts with the most surprising audacity, and what redeems him, what excuses all his errors, is the fact that he does not kill, does not imprison, fabricates no conspiracies, needs no collaborators willing to confess crimes.

== See also ==
- History of Mexico
- List of heads of state of Mexico
- Monument to Lázaro Cárdenas
- Lázaro Cárdenas Park, Puerto Vallarta, Mexico
- Statue of Lázaro Cárdenas (Madrid)

Political offices
Preceded by Abelardo L. Rodríguez	President of Mexico; 1934–1940	Succeeded by Manuel Ávila Camacho
Preceded by Jesús Agustín Castro	Secretary of National Defence; 1942–1945	Succeeded by Francisco Luis Urquizo
Preceded by Luis Méndez	Governor of Michoacán; 1928–1932	Succeeded by Dámaso Cárdenas
Party political offices
Preceded by Emilio Portes	President of the Institutional Revolutionary Party; 1930–1931	Succeeded by Manuel Pérez Treviño
