= Javier Sánchez (architect) =

Mexican developer and architect

Javier Sánchez is a Mexican developer and architect primarily known for contemporary construction in Mexico City, especially the Condesa neighborhood. Sánchez is the founding partner and lead designer of the Mexico City firm JSª, known as Higuera + Sanchez from 1996-2007. Obras magazine voted Sánchez one of the forty most influential architects of the past forty years.

== Biography ==
Sánchez graduated with honors from the Universidad Nacional Autonoma de México (UNAM), and received his master's degree in Real Estate Development from Columbia University in New York City.

Sánchez was at the vanguard of market urbanism in Mexico City. His firm, Higuera + Sánchez, bought a dilapidated warehouse in Condesa and created the city's first studio lofts, including communal space in the heart of the building. Such projects have been described as guerrilla architecture.

== Projects (partial list) ==
=== Mexico City ===
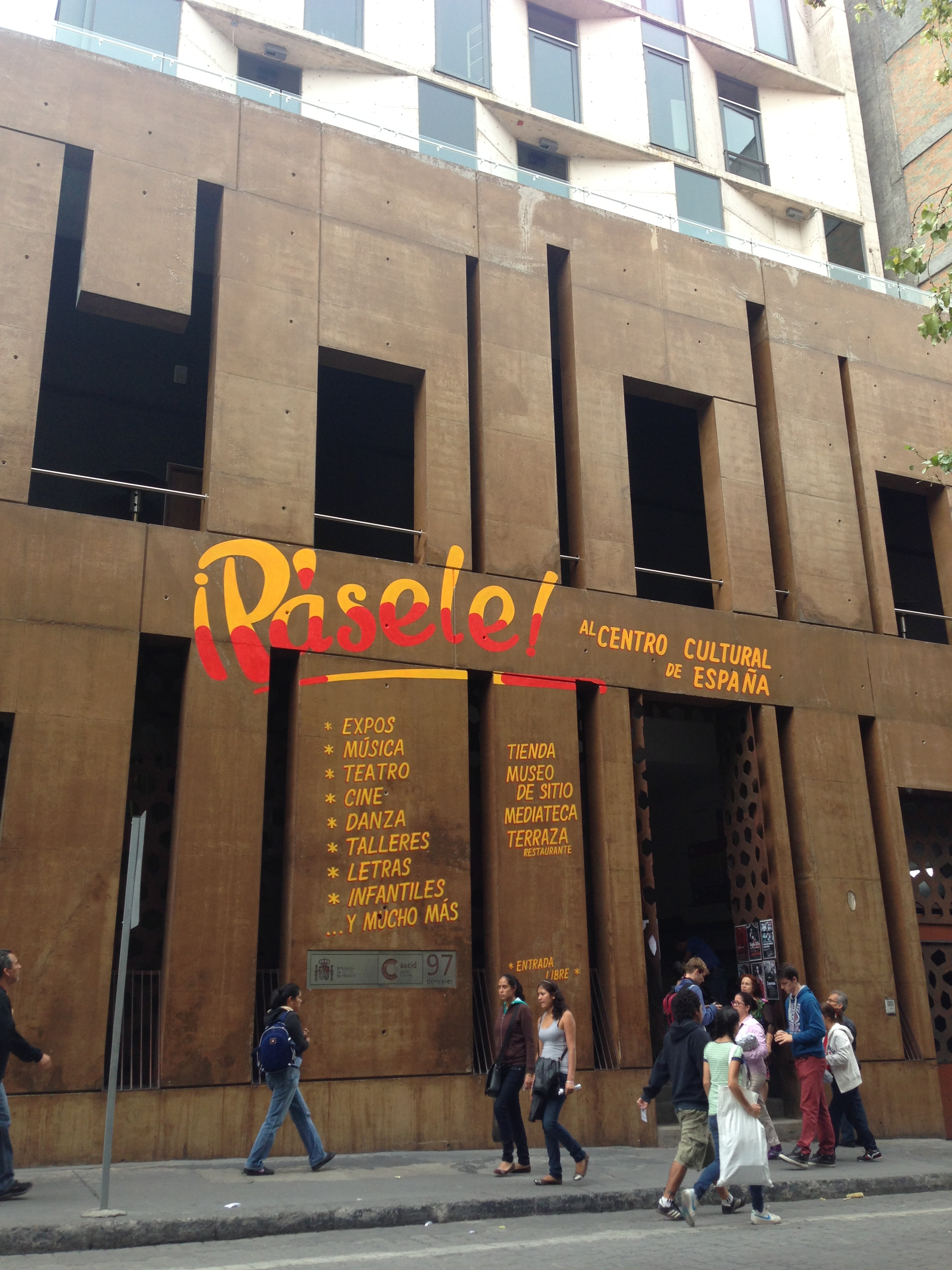
Centro Cultural de España, new wing (2012), Donceles street entrance

- The new wing of the Spanish Cultural Center(2011)
- 13 de Septiembre Adaptive Reuse Housing (2005) - featured in the 2005 New York show Mexico City Dialogues: New Architectural Practices, at the Center for Architecture
- Hotel Condesa DF (2004)
- Parque España, public spaces
- Torre Ámsterdam, a 19-storey tower at Avenida Insurgentes 301-303, not to be confused with the Torre Ámsterdam in Santa Fe, Mexico City

Additional works Most are apartment/condominium complexes unless otherwise noted.

==== Condesa ====
- Ámsterdam 127, 235, 315, 309, 322, Centro Qi gymnasium
- Chilpancingo 17
- Nuevo León 113
- Parque México 39
- Tacámbaro 36
- Teotihuacán 15
- Veracruz 60 and complex at 79-81-83-85-91

==== Roma ====
- Chihuahua 78
- Mérida 49
- Río de Janeiro 64
- Zacatecas 90

==== Other areas ====
- Departamento Campos Elíseos
- Departamento Portofino
- Lamartine 336
- Monte Casino
- Museo del Estanquillo
- Oficinas Apollo
- Oficinas Bowker
- Oficinas Rivera Gaxiola y Asociados
- Parques Polanco apartments
- Progreso 218
- República de Cuba 41-43
- Residencial Spartta
- Sierra Mojada 355
- Temístocles 12
- Tres Picos
- Universidad Claustro de Sorjuana
- Kaly residencial, CDMX

=== China ===
- "Greenhouse" residences, Inner Mongolia

=== Peru ===
- El 22 Beach Housing, (2006) outside Lima - Winner of the Silver Medal of the XI Biennale of Mexican Architecture.

In addition, Sánchez has designed projects in Costa Rica, Panama, Colombia, in Munich, Germany, and pavilions at the Venice Biennale.

== Academic commissions ==
- University of Texas at San Antonio, Visiting Professor of Architectural Design in the Graduate Architecture Program for the 2013 spring semester
- Universidad Nacional Autonoma de México (UNAM)
- Instituto Tecnológico y de Estudios Superiores de Monterrey (ITESM)
- University of Washington
- Kansas State University, 2014-2015 Regnier Visiting Chair

== Society memberships ==
- Honorary Fellow of the American Institute of Architects
