= Centro Cultural de España, Mexico City =

Cultural center of Spain in Mexico City

Coordinates: 19°26′5.99″N 99°7′57.48″W

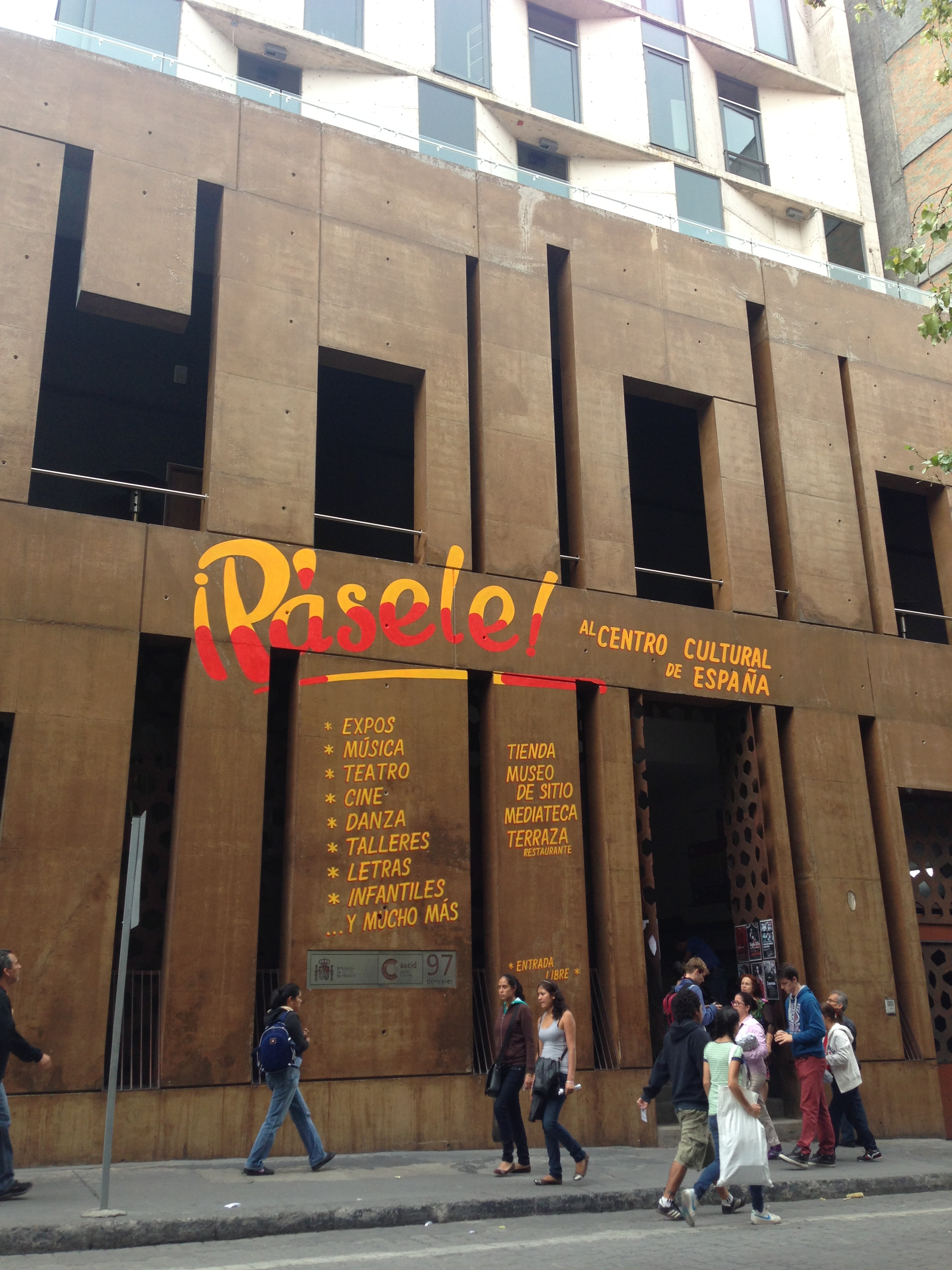
New wing (2012), Donceles street entrance

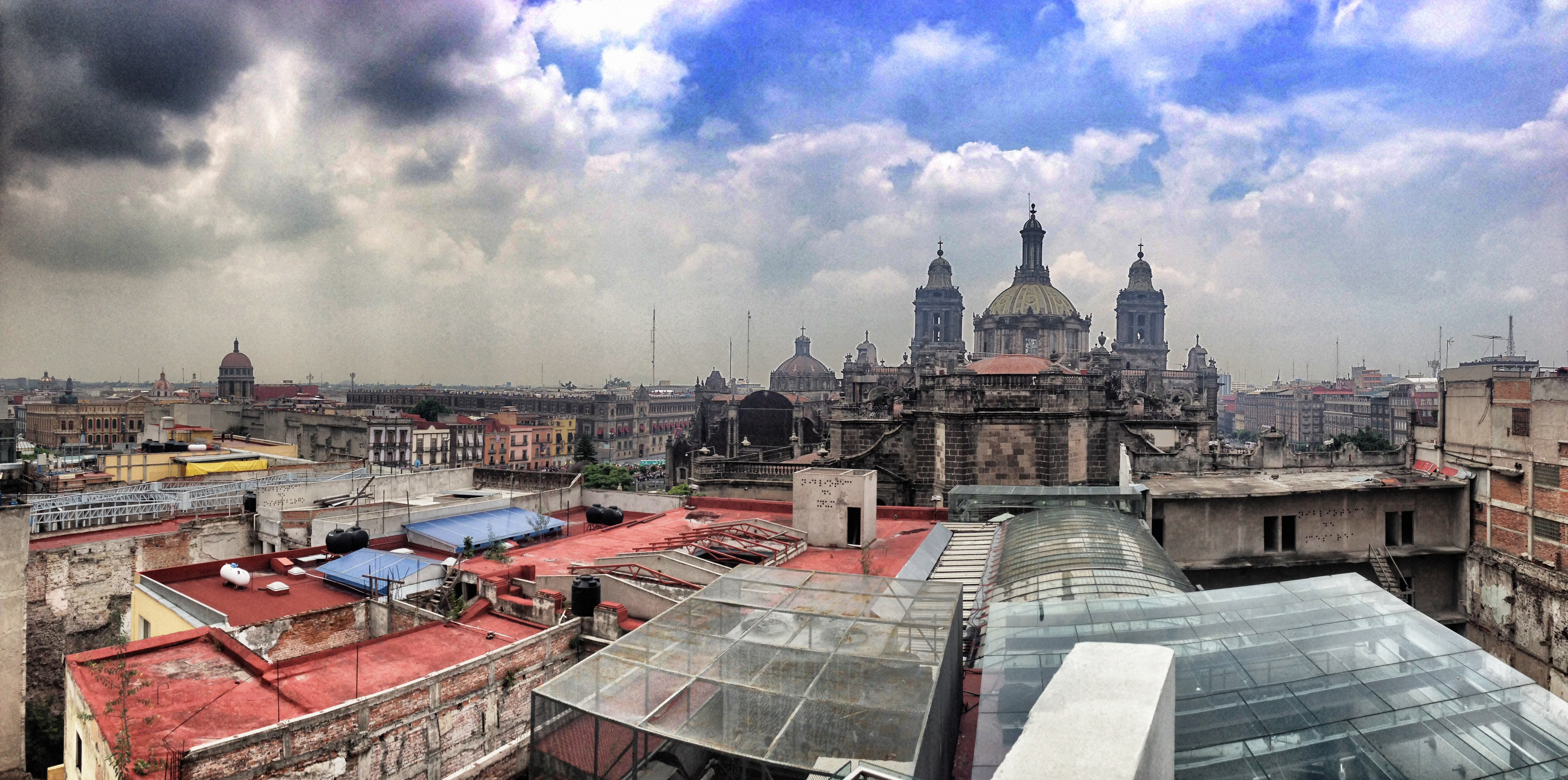
View from roof of new wing

The Centro Cultural de España (Cultural Center of Spain in Mexico) is located at 18 Guatemala Street in the historic center of Mexico City. In the late 1990s, this old mansion just behind the Cathedral was in ruins when the Mexico City government ceded it to the Spanish government. When restoration work was finished, the new Centro Cultural de España was inaugurated by the king of Spain with the president of Mexico in 2002.

The land in this area used to belong to Hernán Cortés, who ceded it to one of his fellow conquistadors. Over the years, it was modified as it passed, it was used as law offices, workshops and various types of stores. In 1985, it was severely damaged by the earthquake and was abandoned until the Spanish government acquired it in 1997. The site was chosen due to a commitment by the Spanish government to save a historical monument in this city. The Spanish undertook a careful restoration of the building.

In 2012 the center was expanded to include a lot facing Donceles street and on this space a completely new 4000 sq m wing including a rooftop terrace. Javier Sánchez was the architect.

This center promotes art exposition of various Mexican and Spanish artists, and includes works by younger, more experimental artists as well as established ones. It also contains a small café upstairs and a gift shop downstairs.
