= Parque España (Mexico City) =

Public park in Mexico City

Coordinates: 19°24′54″N 99°10′17″W

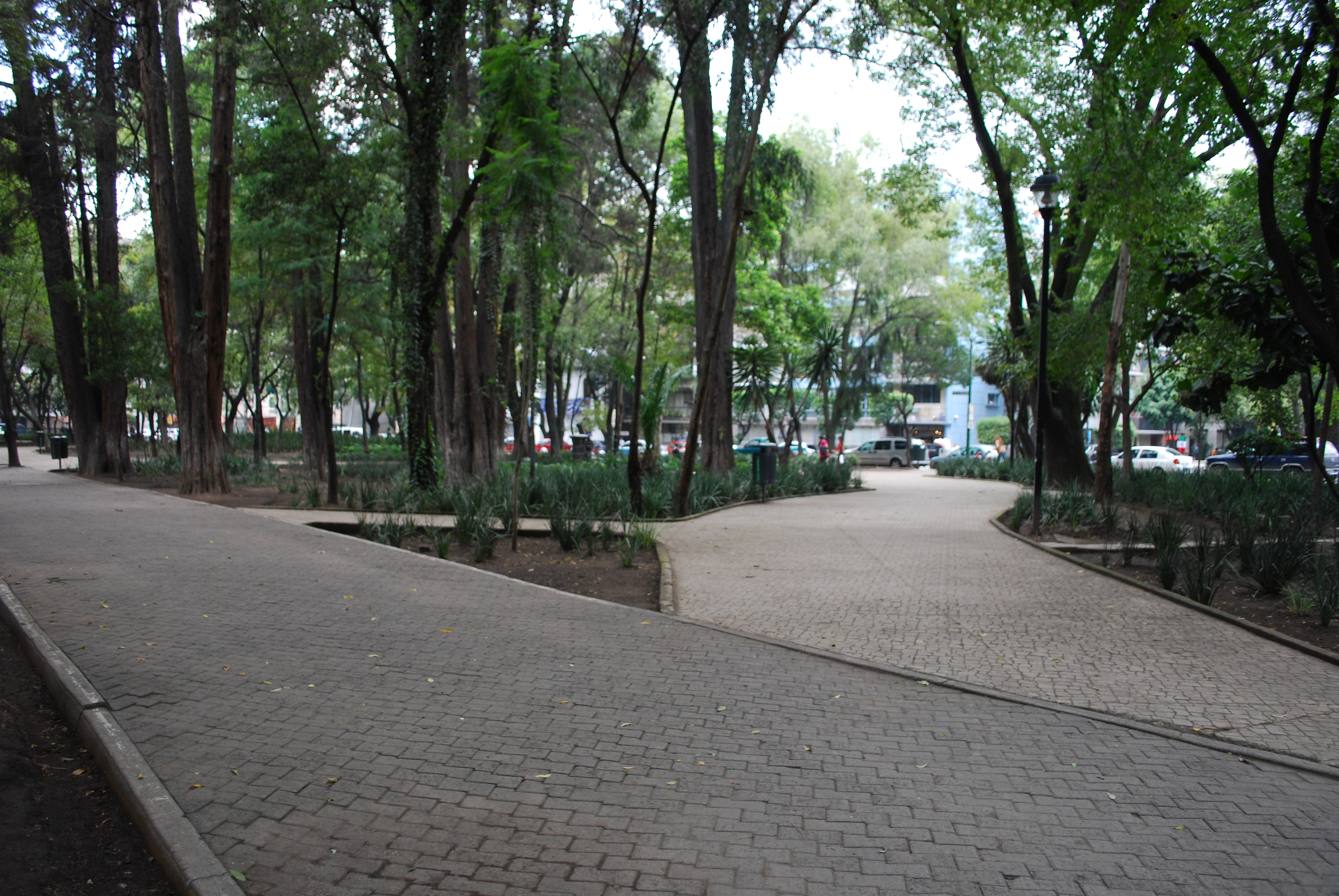
- Path in Parque España
- Interactive map of Parque España
- Location: Mexico City, Mexico

Parque España is a park in the Colonia Hipódromo (neighborhood) of the Condesa district, in the Cuauhtémoc borough, in west-central Mexico City.

It is located between Nuevo León, Sonora and Parque España streets. It was inaugurated on September 21, 1921, to commemorate the 100th anniversary of the end of the Mexican War of Independence. It contains statues such as the monument to Lázaro Cárdenas. The park was designed by the pioneer of modern urban Mexico, architect José Luis Cuevas (not to be confused with the well-known artist by the same name). It has a small lake with a rustic cement bridge that resembles a wooden bridge.

In 2008, the park was renovated and remodeled at a cost of over 12 million pesos. One of new additions was playground areas designed by architect Javier Sánchez. In 2009, it was declared as the “Territory of Music and Poetry” (Territorio de Música y Poesía).

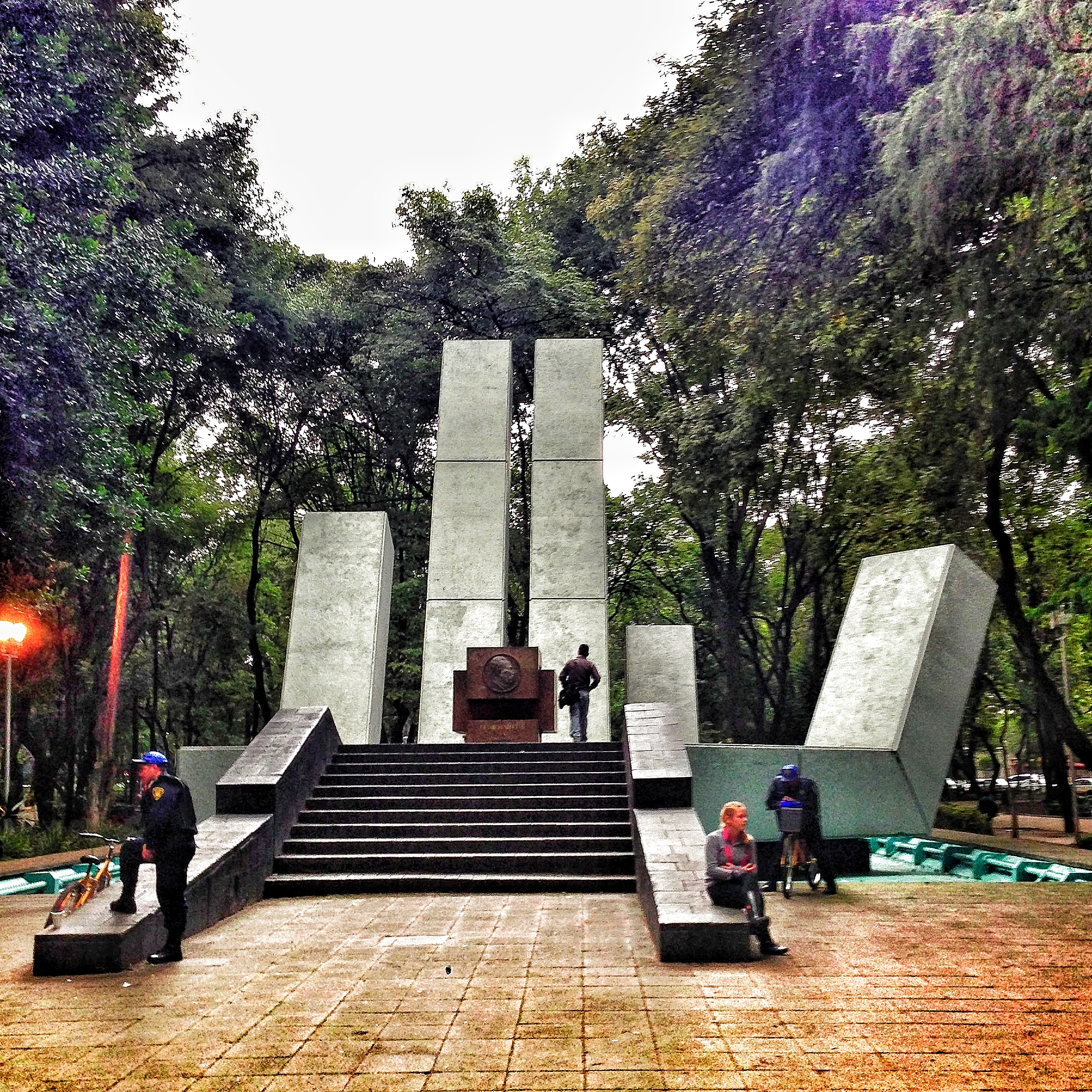
Monument to Lázaro Cárdenas (outstretched hand welcoming Spanish immigrants)

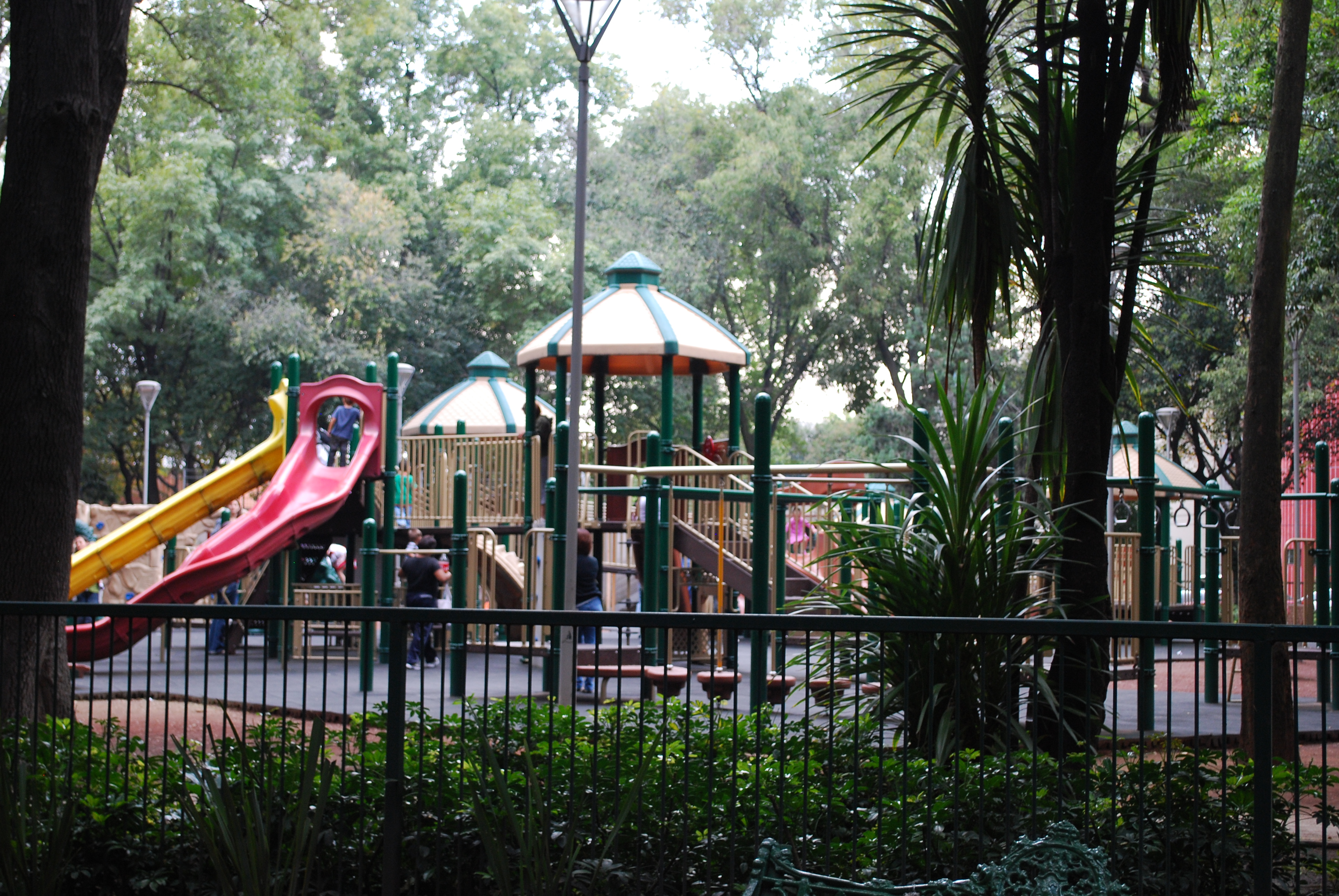
Playground designed by architect Javier Sánchez
