= Monument to Lázaro Cárdenas =

Sculpture in Mexico City, Mexico

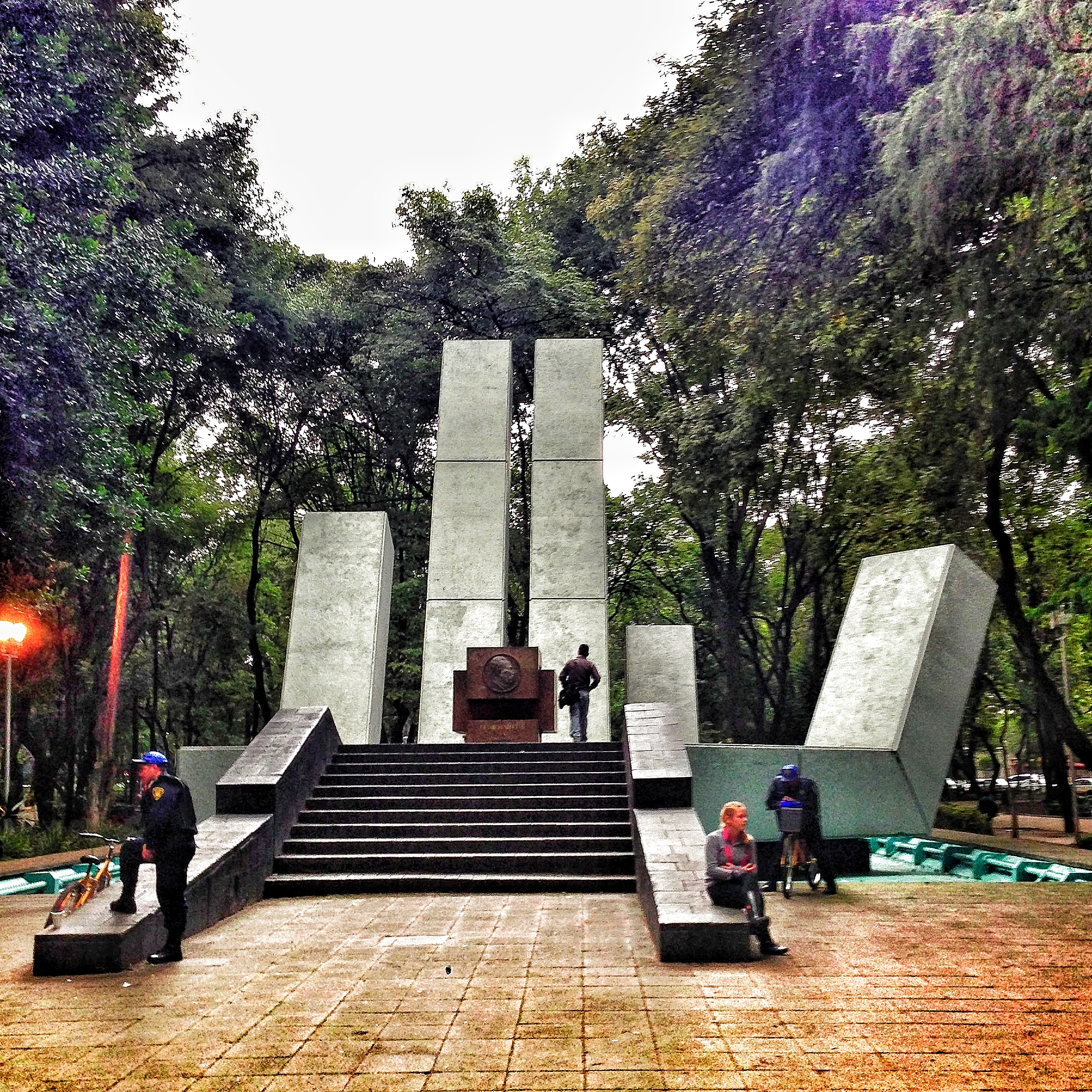
- The monument in 2013
- Location: Mexico City, Mexico; 19°24′55.3″N 99°10′16.4″W

The monument to Lázaro Cárdenas (Spanish: Monumento a Lázaro Cárdenas) is installed in Parque España, in Mexico City, Mexico.
