= Manuel Pérez Treviño =

Mexican politician

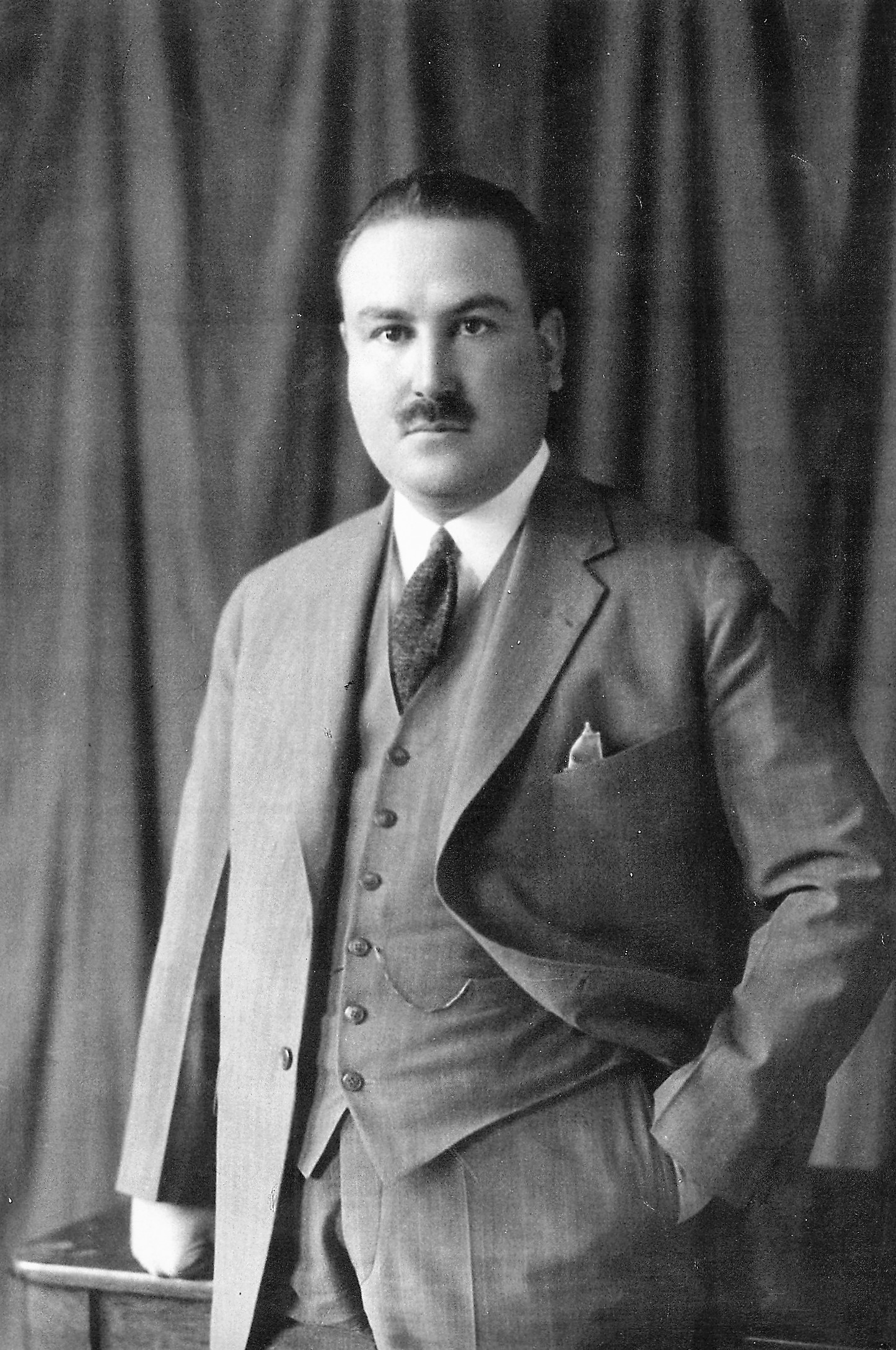
Manuel Pérez Trevińo

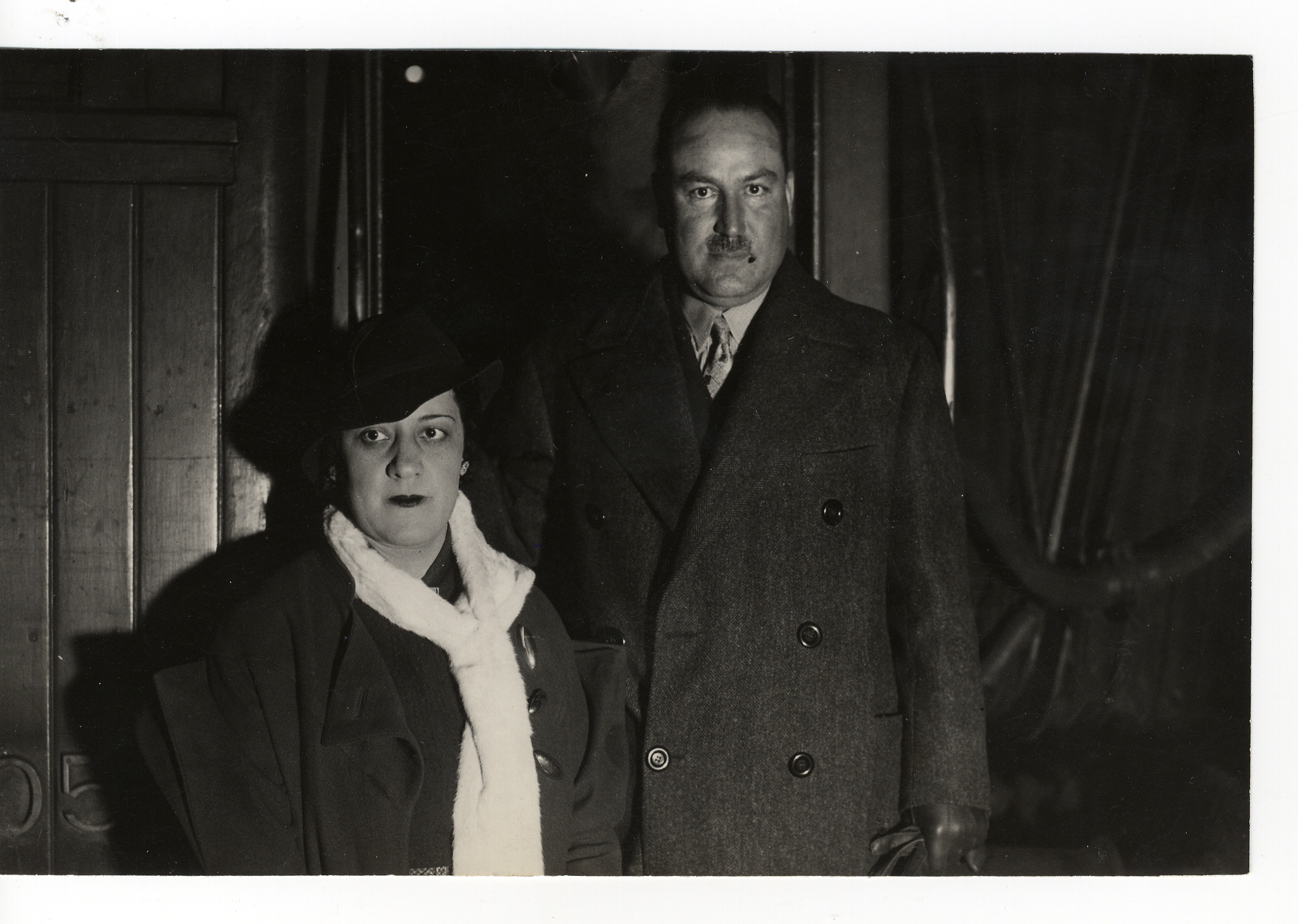
Manuel Pérez Treviño with his wife Esther González Pemoulié

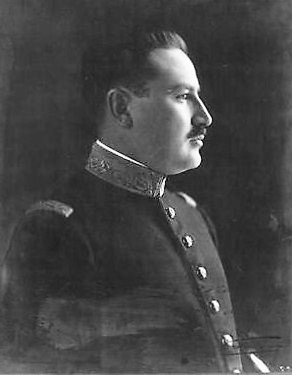
Manuel Pérez Treviño in military uniform

General Manuel Pérez Treviño (June 5, 1890 – April 29, 1945) was a Mexican politician and was an important military and political leader during and after the Mexican Revolution.

Pérez Treviño was born on June 5, 1890, to Jesús Pérez Rodríguez and Candelaria Treviño Rivera in Villa de Guerrero in the state of Coahuila. He was married to Esther González Pemoulié.

In 1913, after studying engineering in Mexico City, he joined the Mexican Revolution as a second captain in an artillery unit. After the Revolution, he was one of the founders of the National Revolutionary Party (PNR, Partido Nacional Revolucionario), which later became the Institutional Revolutionary Party (PRI, Partido Revolucionario Institucional). Among other positions, he was the president of the PNR, governor of Coahuila, preliminary candidate to the Presidency of the Republic, Secretary of Agriculture, Secretary of Industry and Commerce, and ambassador to Chile, Spain, Portugal and Turkey.

While being ambassador in Spain 1936, the civil war started. He and his diplomatic team saved many lives because he ordered to give them asylum at the Mexican embassy in Madrid.

He died on April 29, 1945, in Nueva Rosita, Coahuila.
