= Peruvian Mexicans =

Peruvian Mexicans peruano-mexicanos
Total population
- 8,670 (2020)

Regions with significant populations
- Mexico City; State of Mexico; Jalisco; Nuevo León; Baja California

Languages
- Mexican Spanish and Peruvian Spanish

Religion
- Roman Catholicism

Peruvian Mexicans are Mexican citizens of Peruvian ancestry. Peruvian immigration to Mexico was carried out since the Spanish colonial period in the Mexican territory. In the 1970s, many Peruvian intellectuals came to Mexico for political asylum, in a similar way of how other Latin Americans did, such as Chileans, Argentines and Uruguayan. Today, Peruvian merchants, musicians, students and academics stand out who have settled indefinitely south of the capital. Most Peruvians who travel temporarily to Mexico do so for business and tourism. According to the 2020 census, there are 8,670 Peruvian citizens residing in the country.

== History ==
The first South Americans to arrive in independent Mexico came from Chile and Peru, who passed through the ports of Acapulco and Puerto Ángel, to buy supplies during the boom of the California Gold Rush in the mid-19th century. Some Chilean and Peruvian migrants stayed and put down cultural roots among the coastal populations of the Mexican Pacific coast, from Oaxaca to the Baja California Peninsula.

=== Political asylum ===
In 1973, numerous South Americans escaped the political persecution of the military dictatorships by seeking political asylum, accompanied by Chileans, Uruguayans, Argentines and Peruvians fleeing persecutions carried out by their respective governments. Higher education centers in Mexico served as a platform to protect their stay within the country.

== Culture ==
A possible contribution that Peruvian tradition could have in Mexico is Ceviche. Although Mexican ceviche is different from the Peruvian version; it is thought that this dish could have come from Peru. The data is debatable since it is also theorized that this certain way of preparing ceviche in Mexico could have come from Polynesia during the Spanish routes between New Spain and the Philippines.

== Peruvians living in Mexico ==
- Arturo Yamasaki, soccer referee.
- Laura Bozzo, host.
- Laura Spoya, sports journalist, model and "Miss Peru 2015".
- Marco Zunino, actor.
- Ofelia Montesco, actress.
- Pietro Vannucci, actor.
- Ricardo Blume, actor.
- Roberto Ballesteros, actor.
- Saby Kamalich, actress.
- Segundo Galicia Sánchez, professor, researcher and sociologist.
- Tania Libertad, singer.
- Vanessa Terkes, actress.
- Verónica Montes, actress.
- Walter Ormeño, ex-football player.

== Mexicans of Peruvian descent ==
- Ana Patricia Rojo, actress.
- Jaime Torres Bodet, diplomat, public official, writer, essayist and poet.
- Mario Bellatin, writer.
- Mario H. Gottfried Gutiérrez, businessman.
- Santiago Ormeño, soccer player.

== See also ==
- Mexico–Peru relations
- Peruvian diaspora
- Immigration to Mexico
