= Aarón Sáenz Garza =

Mexican politician

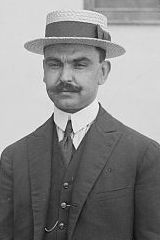
Aarón Sáenz Garza in 1922

Aarón Sáenz Garza (1 June 1891 – 26 February 1983) was a Mexican politician.

== Biography ==
He was born in Monterrey, Nuevo León.

Sáenz Garza served as Secretary of Foreign Affairs during Plutarco Elías Calles' time as president. During his tenure, he continuously defended the Calles Administration's decision to cut oil to the United States when US Secretary of State Frank B. Kellogg tried to bargain for a deal. He soon became Governor of Nuevo León and maintained close ties with Calles; as governor, he even sat with Calles when he questioned the assassin of President-elect Álvaro Obregón in 1928. It was also announced that Calles had plans to nominate him as the Chairman of the National Revolutionary Party. President Pascual Ortiz Rubio appointed him Secretary of Public Education in February 1930. By 1934, Saenz had been dubbed as the "Shadow of Calles" and was named Governor of Mexico's Federal District by Mexican President Lázaro Cárdenas. Cárdenas and the Mexican Congress, however, soon turned on both Calles and Sáenz and condemned their continued persecution against Catholics in the country.

After leaving office in 1935, Sáenz established a sugar corporation and quickly revolutionized sugar production in the country. He was also known as the "king of Mexican sugar", founding a dynasty which survives until this date, led by his son Aaron Sáenz Couret and grandson Aaron Sáenz Hirschfeld, at the head of the leading sugar company in Mexico. At one point, he held a virtual monopoly of Mexico's sugar industry. His monopoly, however, was brought down during the administration of Mexican president Adolfo Ruiz Cortines by 1953. Sáenz was married to Margarita Couret, with whom he had eight sons.

He died on 26 February 1983 at the age of 91.

== Businesses ==
For some time they all managed varied branches of the family's businesses, most of which have ceased to exist or passed into others' ownership. Most notable among these were:

- Mexicana de Aviación (Now bankrupt)
- Sugar mills
- Seguros Atlas—merged with Seguros Comercial America in the 90's and afterwards sold to France's AXA
- Banca Confía—nationalized in 1982, only to be re privatized by Carlos Salinas de Gortari's administration and passing into the hands of Jorge Lankenau's insurance group, later to be merged with Banamex and acquired by Citibank during President Ernesto Zedillo's administration.

== Legacy ==
Aarón Sáenz was related to Raul Sáenz, a prominent Mexican businessman in Chihuahua state, as well as Moisés Sáenz, a prominent Mexican educator and diplomat.
