= List of ambassadors of Mexico to Peru =

Ambassador of Mexico to Peru
- Flag of Mexico
- Incumbent; Vacant since November 2025
- Seat: Lima
- Nominator: President of Mexico
- Inaugural holder: José Morales
- Formation: 1823
- Website: Official site

The ambassador of Mexico to Peru is the highest ranking diplomatic representative of the United Mexican States to the Republic of Peru. The ambassador services the Mexican embassy, located at the district of San Isidro, in Lima. In 2025, the embassy was reduced to an interests sections due to Peru breaking diplomatic relations with Mexico.

== Background ==
Historically, both nations were host to great indigenous cultures; the Aztecs and Mayas in Mexico and the Incas in Peru. During colonization, both nations were part of the Spanish Empire until the early 19th century. Mexico was part of Viceroyalty of New Spain while Peru was part of the Viceroyalty of Peru.

Diplomatic relations between Mexico and Peru were established on March 3, 1823 (but informally date back to October 6, 1821). On the same date, the first Peruvian ambassador to Mexico presented his credentials to Emperor Agustín de Itúrbide. This was two years after Peru gained its independence from Spain. In October 1892, Mexico opened its first consulate in Lima followed by the opening of an embassy on 14 June 1937. Peru inaugurated an embassy on January 17, 1966.

Relations between both countries have historically been continuous and amicable, with few exceptions. In 1932, a letter written by Víctor Raúl Haya de la Torre (at the time exiled in Mexico) was published in the Peruvian press, having been delivered to Lima via a Mexican diplomatic pouch. The event caused Peru to freeze its relations with Mexico, only reestablishing them on May 23 of the following year with the mediation of Spain. Following the souring of relations due to Mexico's role in the 2022 political crisis in Peru, relations were not severed despite the designation of Mexican ambassador to Peru, Pablo Monroy Conesa, as a persona non grata as well as the declaration of an ultimatum for him to leave the country. During this period, First Lady Lilia Paredes and her two children were granted diplomatic asylum, staying at the embassy's residence in Coronel Portillo Avenue prior to their departure.

In 2025, relations were severed by Peru after Mexico granted the asylum request of former Prime Minister Betssy Chávez on November 3, giving chargé d'affaires Karla Tatiana Ornelas Loera an ultimatum to leave the country. In the meantime, security was tightened at the chancery in Jorge Basadre Avenue, as well as the residence, where Chávez would be staying.

== List of representatives ==
Name	Title	Appointed	Presentation of credentials	Term end	President	Notes
José Morales	MPEE	1823	?	?	Supreme Executive Power	
Juan de Dios Cañedo	EEMP	June 3, 1831	May 21, 1832	January 12, 1839	Anastasio Bustamante	Cañedo was named as representative to Peru, Chile, Argentina, Paraguay and Brazil. The affairs of Mexico were turned over to their consulates in Guayaquil, Callao and Valparaíso.
Manuel Crecencio García Rejón y Alcalá	EEMP	January 8, 1842	March 18, 1843	June 9, 1843	Antonio López de Santa Anna	The designation encompassed all the republics south of Mexico. José María Bocanegra, Minister of Foreign Relations, communicated to Havana, Cuba, the disposition of the president of the republic—Antonio López de Santa Anna—for him to return to Mexico in view of the advance of his mission in the South American countries, although at that time he had not finished it. He reported that in accordance with the instructions of President Antonio López de Santa Anna, he had terminated his mission.
1843–1853: Relations limited to the exchange of communications. From 1853 to 1877, the period in which Porfirio Díaz decreed the establishment of a legation in the southern republics, there was no diplomatic representation in Peru except for the vice-consulates in Lima and Callao.
Leonardo López Portillo	EEMP	April 2, 1878	?	October 31, 1879	Porfirio Díaz	Appointed for the legation in the southern republics (Colombia, Venezuela, Ecuador, Peru, Bolivia and Chile).
1879: The withdrawal of the legation to the republics of South America is ordered due to the war between Peru, Bolivia and Chile. On October 8, 1892, the Secretary of Relations of Mexico informed its counterpart in Peru that President Porfirio Díaz agreed to establish a consulate of the republic in Lima, naming Mr. Pedro A. Helguero for that position, who would be promoted to consul general in Peru on May 20, 1897.
José María Gamboa	EEMP	June 3, 1901	January 13, 1903	September 15, 1903	Porfirio Díaz	Appointed before the western republics of South America.
Miguel Covarrubias	EEMP	December 29, 1903	March 10, 1904	May 15, 1907	Porfirio Díaz	Appointed before the South American republics of the Pacific (Chile, Peru, Colombia and Ecuador), with headquarters in Chile. He reported having received his credentials, but on May 1, 1907, faced with the need to pass through Peru on his trip to Mexico, he was told not to present them.
Miguel de Béistegui y Septién	EEMP	May 16, 1907	November 13, 1909	April 5, 1911	Porfirio Díaz	His appointment was for the South American republics on the Pacific side (Chile, Peru, Colombia and Ecuador).
Luis G. Pardo	EEMP	May 22, 1911	August 26, 1911	October 25, 1912	Porfirio Díaz	Named in Chile and other South American republics on the Pacific side (Peru, Colombia and Ecuador). Accredited before the Chilean government.
Adolfo Mújica y Sáyago	EEMP	October 4, 1912	August 18, 1913	March 24, 1915	Francisco I. Madero	Designated in Chile and other South American republics on the Pacific side. On instructions from the SFA, he mailed his credentials to Peru. The SFA removed him from his position. However, he continued in office by ignoring his personality to remove him from Jesús Urueta, Undersecretary for Relations and Office Manager. On November 6, 1915, the Foreign Ministry denied it any official character and confirmed Eduardo F. Hay as its diplomatic representative before the Peruvian government.
Eduardo F. Hay	AC	December 29, 1914	?	December 29, 1915	Eulalio Gutiérrez	
Manuel Méndez Palacios	MR	July 20, 1916	April 17, 1917	October 1, 1917	Disputed	His designation included Bolivia and Peru.
Juan Manuel Alcaraz Tornel	ENAI	May 8, 1917	?	April 12, 1919	Venustiano Carranza	
Alfonso M. Siller	MR	December 17, 1918	April 14, 1919	November 25, 1919	Venustiano Carranza	Named to the governments of Peru and Bolivia.
José G. Moreno de la Torre	ENAI	August 9, 1919	?	April 15, 1920	Venustiano Carranza	
Alfonso M. Siller	EEMP	March 17, 1920	April 17, 1920	June 12, 1920	Venustiano Carranza	Named in Peru and Bolivia.
José G. Moreno de la Torre	ENAI	June 12, 1920	?	June 16, 1921	Adolfo de la Huerta	
Manuel Méndez Palacios	MR	April 14, 1921	July 2, 1921	May 30, 1922	Álvaro Obregón	On August 11, 1922, the Presidency of the Republic agreed to terminate the commission of Palacios as of May 30 of that same year.
Crisóforo Justiniano Canseco Álvarez	ENAI	April 5, 1922	?	January 8, 1923	Álvaro Obregón	
Leopoldo Ortiz Liebich	ENAI	January 9, 1923	?	August 1, 1923	Álvaro Obregón	
Leopoldo Ortiz Liebich	EEMP	August 1, 1923	October 4, 1923	August 17, 1926	Álvaro Obregón	On January 1, 1924, he was appointed to the same position before the government of Ecuador, but the headquarters were in Lima.
Flavio A. Bórquez	EEMP	August 5, 1926	September 25, 1926	October 16, 1928	Plutarco Elías Calles	Died in Lima.
Joaquín Mesa	ENAI	June 8, 1928	?	February 28, 1929	Emilio Portes Gil	Died in Lima.
Juan G. Cabral	EEMP	December 16, 1928	March 8, 1929	September 22, 1932	Emilio Portes Gil	On May 12, 1932, the Mexican legation had to move to Panama when accused by the Peruvian government of intervention in internal political affairs. The clerk Gilberto Owen was appointed in charge of the Mexican consulate, but the legation's archives were —first— in charge of the Chilean representative in Peru, Manuel Rivas, and later in the hands of the Spanish representative in Lima, Antonio Jean. Diplomatic relations were resumed on May 21, 1933 (Declaration of Madrid).
Juan Manuel Álvarez del Castillo	EEMP	June 16, 1933	July 24, 1933	December 3, 1935	Abelardo L. Rodríguez	
Moisés Sáenz Garza	EEMP	January 1, 1936	May 14, 1936	March 22, 1937	Lázaro Cárdenas	Bernardo Reyes Morales was accredited as ENAI.
Moisés Sáenz Garza	EEP	June 16, 1937	July 13, 1937	January 31, 1938	Lázaro Cárdenas	On June 14, 1937, the Mexican legation was elevated to the rank of embassy. In 1938, Sáenz is informed of the conclusion of his work in Peru and Antonio H. Aguirre remains as EAL.
Moisés Sáenz Garza	EEP	October 1, 1938	November 7, 1938	October 24, 1941	Lázaro Cárdenas	The first is the date on which the SFA gave him instructions to resume his functions as ambassador to the government of Peru. The second is the date where he arrives in Lima and Carlos Augusto Baumbach Griethe, ENAI, hands the legation over to him. The third is his death date in Quito, Ecuador.
Carlos Esteban Peón del Valle y Varona	ENAI	November 26, 1941	?	July 29, 1942	Manuel Ávila Camacho	
Adalberto Tejeda Olivares	EEP	December 1, 1941	July 11, 1942	October 1, 1948	Manuel Ávila Camacho	
José María Ortiz Tirado	EEP	October 1, 1948	December 17, 1948	March 25, 1952	Miguel Alemán Valdés	
Leobardo C. Ruiz Camarillo	EEP	April 1, 1952	May 27, 1952	November 30, 1952	Miguel Alemán Valdés	
Joaquín Barrera Aceves	ENAI	November 21, 1952	?	February 25, 1954	Adolfo Ruiz Cortines	
Carlos Darío Ojeda Rovira	EEP	March 14, 1954	April 1, 1954	October 28, 1957	Adolfo Ruiz Cortines	
Salvador Martínez de Alva	EEP	October 25, 1957	March 14, 1958	March 10, 1960	Adolfo Ruiz Cortines	
Fidencio Soria Barajas	ENAI	July 10, 1960	?	January 6, 1961	Adolfo López Mateos	
José Luis Martínez Rodríguez	EEP	January 1, 1961	January 10, 1961	January 12, 1963	Adolfo López Mateos	His mission in Peru ends after being appointed permanent representative of Mexico to UNESCO, although his letters of withdrawal were extended on February 3, 1964.
Carlos Villamil Cícero	ENAI	February 12, 1963	?	March 23, 1964	Adolfo López Mateos	
Daniel Escalante Ortega	EEP	February 3, 1964	March 31, 1964	December 15, 1968	Adolfo López Mateos	
Luis Gerardo Zorrilla Ochoa	EEP	November 16, 1968	February 5, 1969	February 1, 1974	Gustavo Díaz Ordaz	
Julio R. Zamora Bátiz	EEP	February 18, 1974	March 13, 1974	March 31, 1976	Luis Echeverría	
Santiago H. Suárez Gil	ENAI	April 22, 1976	?	January 31, 1977	Luis Echeverría	
José Francisco Villarreal Reyna	EEP	January 4, 1977	February 16, 1977	April 30, 1979	José López Portillo	
Donaciano González Gómez	EEP	February 21, 1979	March 28, 1979	December 16, 1980	José López Portillo	
Ismael Moreno Pino	EEP	February 3, 1981	March 17, 1981	May 16, 1986	José López Portillo	
Jesús Puente Leyva	EEP	February 20, 1986	July 1, 1986	November 11, 1989	Miguel de la Madrid	
Edgardo Flores Rivas	EEP	September 18, 1989	November 16, 1989*	November 19, 1993	Carlos Salinas de Gortari	
Manuel Martínez del Sobral y Penichet	EEP	October 7, 1993	December 2, 1993	April 15, 1995	Carlos Salinas de Gortari	
Federico Alfonso Urruchúa Durand	EEP	March 24, 1995	June 20, 1995	December 21, 1998	Ernesto Zedillo	
José Ignacio Piña Rojas	EEP	April 22, 1999	June 21, 1999	September 21, 2001	Ernesto Zedillo	
Ricardo Villanueva Hallal	EEP	June 11, 2001	September 28, 2001	October 13, 2004	Vicente Fox	
Antonio Guillermo Villegas Villalobos	EEP	October 28, 2004	April 28, 2005	October 2009	Vicente Fox	
Jorge Cícero Fernández	ENAI	November 2009	?	March 2011	Felipe Calderón	
Manuel Rodríguez Arriaga	EEP	March 31, 2011*	April 15, 2011	2014	Felipe Calderón	
Ernesto Campos Tenorio	EEP	2014			Enrique Peña Nieto	
Víctor Hugo Morales Meléndez	EEP		June 21, 2019	2022	Andrés Manuel López Obrador	
Pablo Monroy Conesa	EEP		May 31, 2022	December 2022	Andrés Manuel López Obrador	Ambassador Monroy was declared a persona non grata in December 2022 and given an ultimatum to leave the country.
Karla Tatiana Ornelas Loera	ENAI	December 21, 2022		November 2025	Andrés Manuel López Obrador	

== See also ==
- List of ambassadors of Peru to Mexico
