= List of ambassadors of Peru to Mexico =

Ambassador of Peru to the United Mexican States
- Great Seal of Peru
- Ministry of Foreign Affairs; Paseo de la Reforma 2601, Mexico D.F.
- Appointer: The president of Peru
- Inaugural holder: José de Morales y Ugalde
- Formation: January 3, 1823
- Website: Embassy of Peru in Mexico

The extraordinary and plenipotentiary ambassador of Peru to the United Mexican States is the official representative of the Republic of Peru to the United Mexican States.

Historically, both nations were host to great indigenous cultures; the Aztecs and Mayas in Mexico and the Incas in Peru. During colonization, both nations were part of the Spanish Empire until the early 19th century. Mexico was part of Viceroyalty of New Spain while Peru was part of the Viceroyalty of Peru. Diplomatic relations between Mexico and Peru were established on March 3, 1823. On the same date, the first Peruvian ambassador to Mexico presented his credentials to Emperor Agustín de Itúrbide. This was two years after Peru gained its independence from Spain. In October 1892, Mexico opened its first consulate in Lima followed by the opening of an embassy on 14 June 1937. Peru inaugurated an embassy on January 17, 1966.

Relations between both countries have been continuous and amicable, with one exception in 1932, when a letter written by Víctor Raúl Haya de la Torre (at the time exiled in Mexico) was published in the Peruvian press, having been delivered to Lima via a Mexican diplomatic pouch. The event caused Peru to sever its relations with Mexico, only reestablishing them on May 23 of the following year with the mediation of Spain. Despite the souring of relations due to Mexico's role in the 2022 political crisis in Peru, neither Mexico nor Peru have severed relations despite the latter's declaration of Mexican ambassador to Peru, Pablo Monroy Conesa, as a persona non grata as well as the declaration of an ultimatum for him to leave the country.

== List of representatives ==
Name	Portrait	Term begin	Term end	President	Notes
José de Morales y Ugalde		January 3, 1823	?	José de La Mar	
Juan Pablo Fernandini		1824	?	Simón Bolívar	
Manuel Nicolás Corpancho		March 16, 1862	August 28, 1863	Ramón Castilla	
Víctor Manuel Maúrtua		November 5, 1900	1901	Eduardo López de Romaña	
Manuel Álvarez Calderón		1901	1902	Eduardo López de Romaña	
Federico Alfonso Pezet		1910	1910	Augusto B. Leguía	
José María Barreto		1916	1919?	José Pardo y Barreda	
Leoncio I. de Mora		1922	1924?	Augusto B. Leguía	As Consul general
Pedro Pablo Mujica Carassa		July 10, 1924	?	Augusto B. Leguía	
Oscar Barrenechea y Raygada		1929	1930?	Augusto B. Leguía	
Gonzalo Ulloa Ruíz de Somocurcio		1930	?	Augusto B. Leguía	
Rafael Belaúnde Diez Canseco		1933	January 15, 1938	Óscar R. Benavides	The Legation became an embassy in 1937.
José Jacinto Rada		January 15, 1938	1938	Óscar R. Benavides	
Alfredo Correa Elías		February 24, 1938		Óscar R. Benavides	Sent with the purpose of reinforcing the anti-Aprista work of José Jacinto Rada.
Luis Fernán Cisneros Bustamante		1939	1945	Manuel Prado Ugarteche	
Germán Aramburú Lecardos		1946	1946	José Luis Bustamante y Rivero	
Pablo Abril de Vivero		1946	1948	José Luis Bustamante y Rivero	
Marcos García Arrese		1951	1952	Manuel A. Odría	Chargé d'Affairs
Óscar Vázquez Benavides		1952	1955	Manuel A. Odría	
Carlos Miró-Quesada Laos		1952	1953	Manuel A. Odría	
Óscar Rebagliati Martins		1953		Manuel A. Odría	
Alejandro Deustúa Arrospide		1954		Manuel A. Odría	
Emilio Romero Padilla		1955	1955	Manuel A. Odría	
Luis E. Vinatea		January 5, 1956		Manuel A. Odría	
Germán Aramburú Lecaros		1958		Manuel Prado Ugarteche	
Álvaro Rey de Castro López de Romaña		1959		Manuel Prado Ugarteche	
Edgardo Seoane		1965	1967	Fernando Belaúnde	
Alejandro Deustúa Arrospide		September 12, 1967	1969	Fernando Belaúnde	
Aníbal Ponce Sobrevilla		1969	September 11, 1970	Juan Velasco Alvarado	
Alfonso Benavides Correa		September 11, 1970	1974	Juan Velasco Alvarado	
Felipe de Bustamante Denegrí		1975		Francisco Morales Bermúdez	
Jorge Gordillo Barreto		1976		Francisco Morales Bermúdez	
Juan de la Piedra Villalonga		1981	1986	Fernando Belaúnde	
Jorge Raygada Cauvi		1986		Alan García	
Wilfredo Huaita		1990		Alberto Fujimori	
Alberto Cazorla Talleri		1991	1995	Alberto Fujimori	
Víctor Malca Villanueva		March 6, 1996	October 15, 1996	Alberto Fujimori	
Alfredo Arosemena Ferreyros		2002	2006	Alejandro Toledo	
Carlos Berninzon Devéscovi		2007	2009	Alan García	
Luis Alvarado Contreras		March 2009		Alan García	
Elizabeth Astete		February 24, 2012	September 14, 2013	Alan García	
Javier Eduardo León Olavarria		August 17, 2013		Ollanta Humala	
Julio Hernán Garro Gálvez		2016	November 30, 2021	Ollanta Humala	Appointed as Peruvian representative to OPANAL in 2022.
Manuel Gerardo Talavera Espinar		December 1, 2021	December 7, 2022	Pedro Castillo	Talavera's removal was announced on February 24, 2023 after Mexican President Andrés Manuel López Obrador made comments in support of former president Pedro Castillo following a meeting with Lilia Paredes.

== See also ==
- List of ambassadors of Mexico to Peru
