= Mexico–Peru relations =

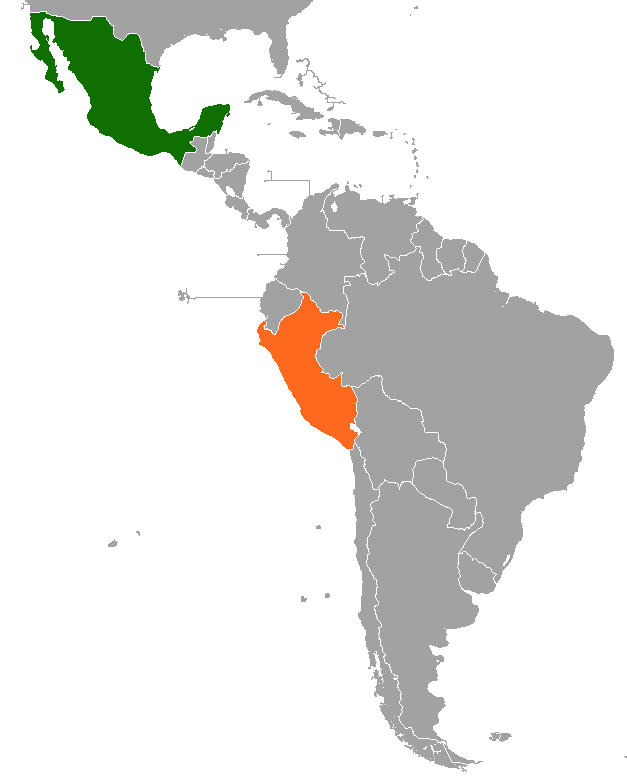

- Mexico: Peru

The nations of Mexico and Peru established diplomatic relations in 1823. Diplomatic relations were briefly cut in 1932 and reinstated in 1933. Diplomatic relations were cut in November 2025, however, they were reinstated again in August 2026.

Both nations are members of the Asia-Pacific Economic Cooperation, Community of Latin American and Caribbean States, Lima Group, Organization of Ibero-American States, Organization of American States, Pacific Alliance and the United Nations.

== History ==
Historically, both nations were host to great indigenous cultures; the Aztecs and Mayas in Mexico and the Incas in Peru. During colonization, both nations were part of the Spanish Empire until the early 19th century. Mexico was part of Viceroyalty of New Spain while Peru was part of the Viceroyalty of Peru. Diplomatic relations between Mexico and Peru were established on 23 January 1823, two years after Peru gained its independence from Spain. In October 1892, Mexico opened its first consulate in Lima followed by the opening of an embassy on 14 June 1937.

In 1932, a Peruvian newspaper published a letter by Peruvian politician Víctor Raúl Haya de la Torre where he talks about wanting to establish different styles of governing in Latin America. The letter was addressed to a colleague and states the plan in detail to another friend who he sent a letter (but never arrived) via a Mexican diplomatic pouch to Lima. This letter caused such an outrage in Peru that the government accused the Mexican government of 'meddling' in its internal affairs and severed diplomatic relations with Mexico. Diplomatic relations were once again restored in 1933 with the incoming of a new president in Peru.

In 1960, President Adolfo López Mateos was the first highest ranking Mexican official to visit Peru, followed by President Luis Echeverría in 1974. It was not until the 1990s that Peruvian Presidents Alan Garcia and Alberto Fujimori paid official visits to Mexico. Since then, there have been a continuous flow of official visits by both nations to each other's countries, respectively.

In 2012, both nations became founding founders of the Pacific Alliance (along with Colombia and Chile). In July 2016, Mexican President Enrique Peña Nieto attended the inauguration of President Pedro Pablo Kuczynski. In December 2018, Peruvian President Martín Vizcarra attended the inauguration of President Andrés Manuel López Obrador.

In December 2022, López Obrador revealed that Peruvian President Pedro Castillo intended to request political asylum following the backlash to Castillo's attempted self-coup. Castillo was arrested before reaching the Mexican Embassy in Lima. On December 20, the family of former President Castillo was granted asylum and flown to Mexico. The Mexican ambassador in Lima was declared "persona non grata" and ordered to leave Peru. In February 2023, Peruvian President Dina Boluarte withdrew the ambassador of Peru in Mexico. In May 2023, the Peruvian Congress declared Mexican President Andrés Manuel López Obrador persona non grata citing "his meddling in Peru's internal affairs and marking a deepening diplomatic split in the region". President López Obrador has also refused to hand over the presidency of the Pacific Alliance to Peru as the Mexican Government refuses to recognize President Boluarte and her Government since the removal of President Pedro Castillo, however, the presidency was passed on to Boluarte by Chilean President Gabriel Boric in 2023.

In April 2024, Mexico's Secretariat of the Interior announced that it will return to asking visas for Peruvian citizens entering the country, arguing that there has been an increase in the influx of Peruvian citizens trying to illegally cross the Mexican border to the United States. Mexico had previously stopped asking visas for Peruvian citizens back in 2012 as an agreement to boost tourism and business between Pacific Alliance members. In response to the unilateral visa resumption, citing reciprocity, the Peruvian Ministry of Foreign Affairs announced that the country will also be asking visas for Mexican citizens entering the country. However, four days later, Peru reversed its stance and decided to repeal the official decree imposing visas for Mexican citizens, mostly due to concerns from local business unions about the measure's impact on the tourism sector.

On November 3, 2025, Peru broke relations with Mexico after Betssy Chávez sought asylum inside the Mexican embassy in Lima. Both countries will retain consular and trade relations. As of January 2026, Mexican diplomatic interests in Peru are being managed on its behalf by Brazil. In August 2026, Peruvian President Keiko Fujimori and Mexican President Claudia Sheinbaum reinstated diplomatic relations between both nations. In November 2026, both Presidents Fujimori and Sheinbaum met on the sidelines of the APEC summit in Shenzhen, China.

== High-level visits ==
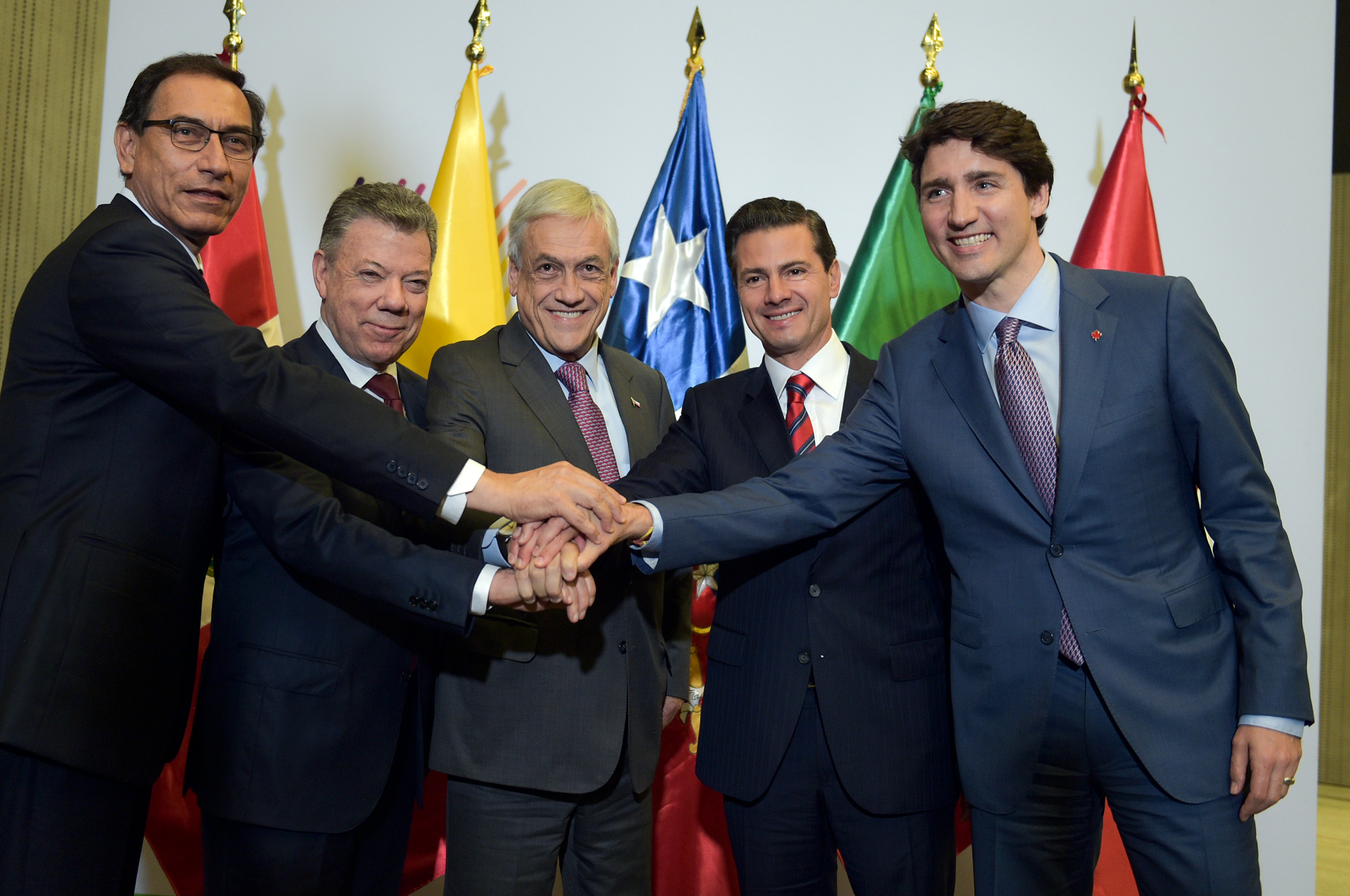
President Martín Vizcarra and President Enrique Peña Nieto at the 8th Summit of the Americas in Lima, Peru; April 2018.

Presidential visits from Mexico to Peru

- President Adolfo López Mateos (1960)
- President Luis Echeverría (1974)
- President Carlos Salinas de Gortari (1989)
- President Vicente Fox (2001, 2003, 2004)
- President Felipe Calderón (2008, 2011)
- President Enrique Peña Nieto (2013, 2015, July and November 2016, 2018)

Presidential visits from Peru to Mexico

- President Alan García (1985, 1987)
- President Alberto Fujimori (1991, 1996)
- President Alejandro Toledo (2002)
- President Ollanta Humala (2011, June and December 2014)
- President Martín Vizcarra (July and December 2018)
- President Pedro Castillo (2021)

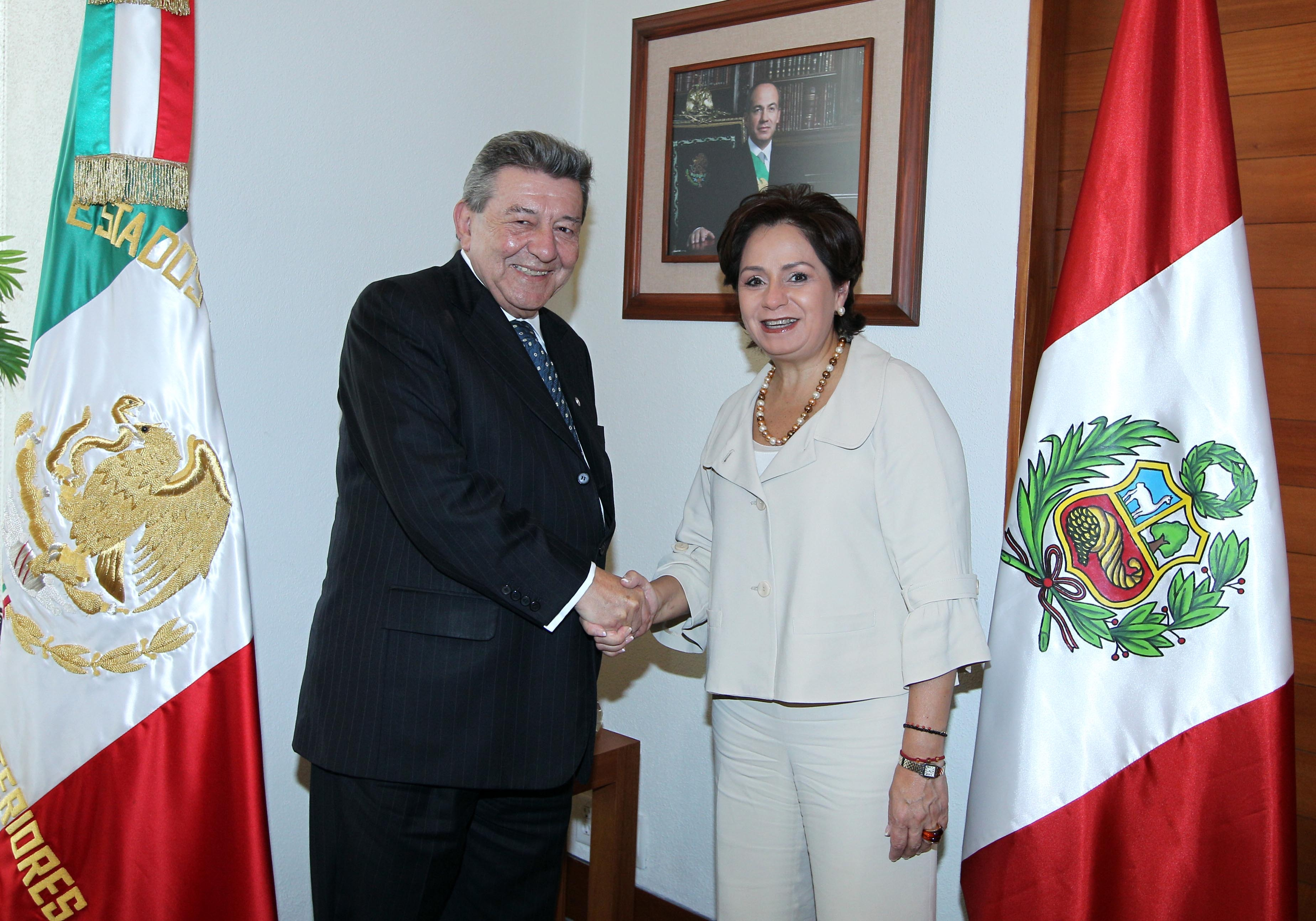
Peruvian Foreign Minister Rafael Roncagliolo and Mexican Foreign Secretary Patricia Espinosa in Mexico City; 2012.

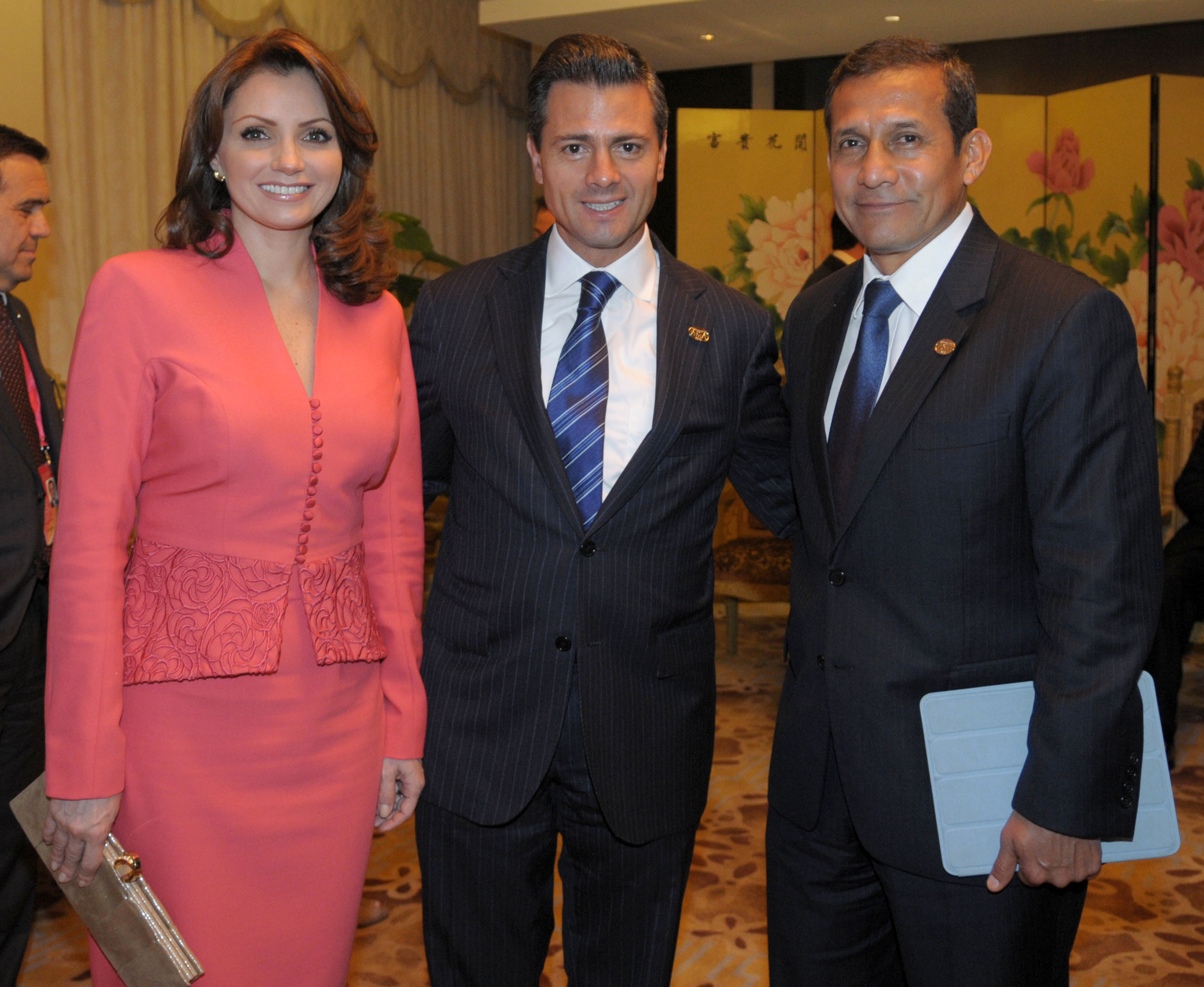
President Enrique Peña Nieto along with First Lady Angélica Rivera and President Ollanta Humala in Tokyo, Japan; 2013.

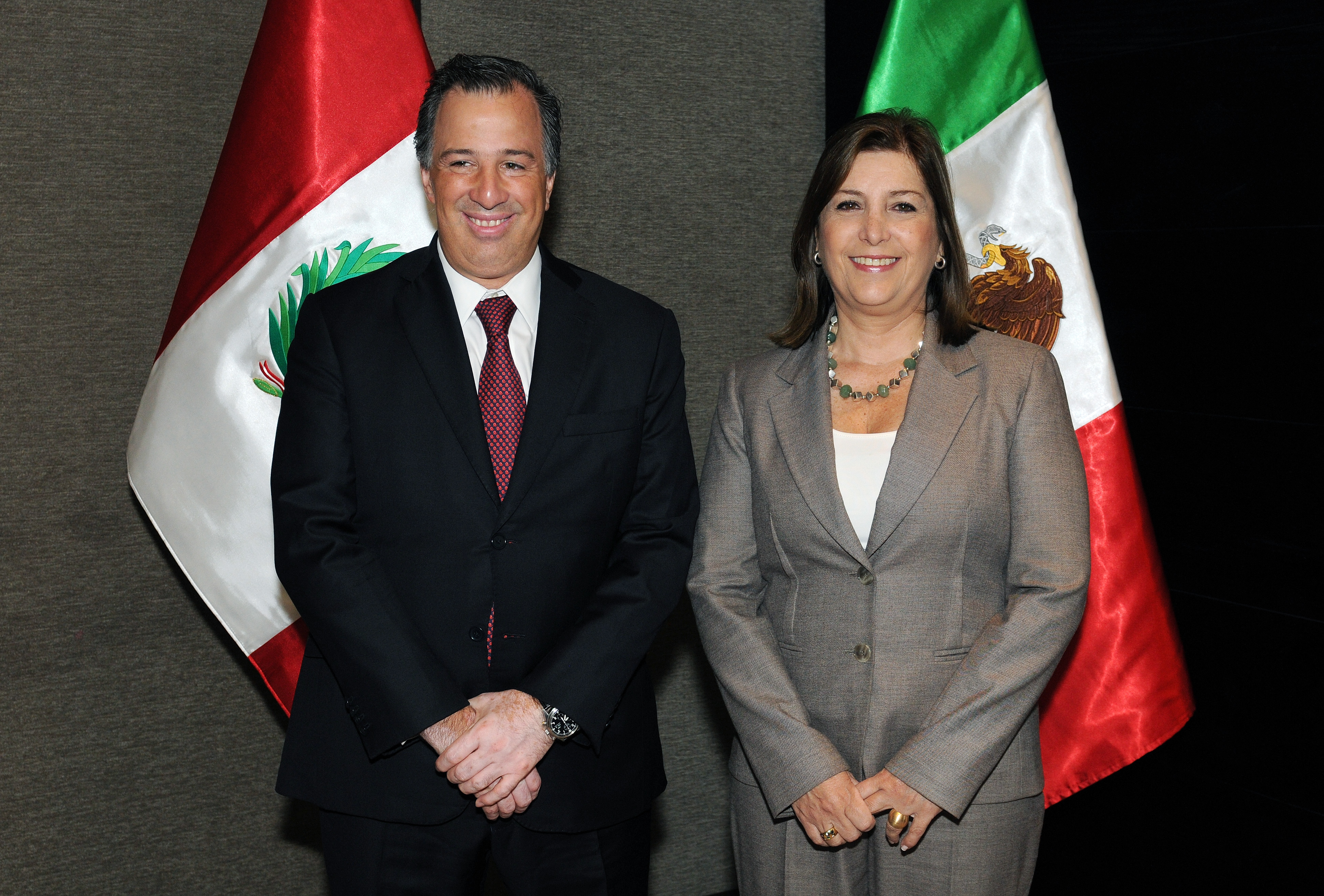
Mexican Foreign Secretary José Antonio Meade and Peruvian Foreign Minister Eda Rivas in Lima; 2014.

President Pedro Castillo and Foreign Secretary Marcelo Ebrard attending the CELAC summit in Mexico City; 2021.

== Bilateral agreements ==
Both nations have signed several bilateral agreements such as an Arbitration Treaty (1902); Agreement for the Exchange of Diplomatic Pouches (1919); Agreement for Cultural and Educational Cooperation (1975); Agreement on Tourism Cooperation (1987); Agreement on Air Transportation (1989); Agreement of Cooperation in Combating Drug Trafficking and Drug Dependency (1991); Agreement on Technical and Scientific Cooperation (1996); Extradition Treaty (2000); Agreement on Legal Assistance in Criminal Matters (2000); Agreement on the Execution of Criminal Judgments (2002); Agreement for Protection, Conservation, Recovery and Return of Stolen Archaeological, Artistic, Historical and Cultural Goods (2002); Agreement for Commercial Integration (2011); Agreement on the Avoidance of Double Taxation and to Prevent Fiscal Evasion in relation to Taxes on Income (2011) and an Agreement of Strategic Association (2014).

== Transportation ==
There are direct flights between both nations with the following airlines: Aeroméxico, LATAM Perú, Sky Airline Peru and Volaris.

== Trade relations ==
On 1 February 2012, a free trade agreement between the two nations came into effect. In 2023, two-way trade between both nations amounted to US$2.7 billion. Mexico's main exports to Peru include: flat screen TVs; tractors for semi-trailers; shampoos; corrugated bars; silver minerals; electronics and automobiles. Peru's main exports to Mexico include: natural gas; minerals from copper; tomato; calamari; boxes, crates and cages; lead minerals; chilies sweets or peppers; tables, planks and beams.

Several Mexican multinational companies such as América Móvil, Cinépolis, FEMSA, Grupo Bimbo, Grupo México, Grupo Salinas, Orbia, Oxxo and Sigma Alimentos (among others) operate in Peru. Peruvian multinational company Ajegroup (Kola Real) operates in Mexico. In 2022, Mexican companies invested US$16 billion in Peru. Mexico is Peru's third largest trading partner in Latin America (after Brazil and Chile).

== Resident diplomatic missions ==
of Mexico in Peru

- Lima (Embassy)

of Peru in Mexico

- Mexico City (Embassy)
- Mexico City (Consulate-General)

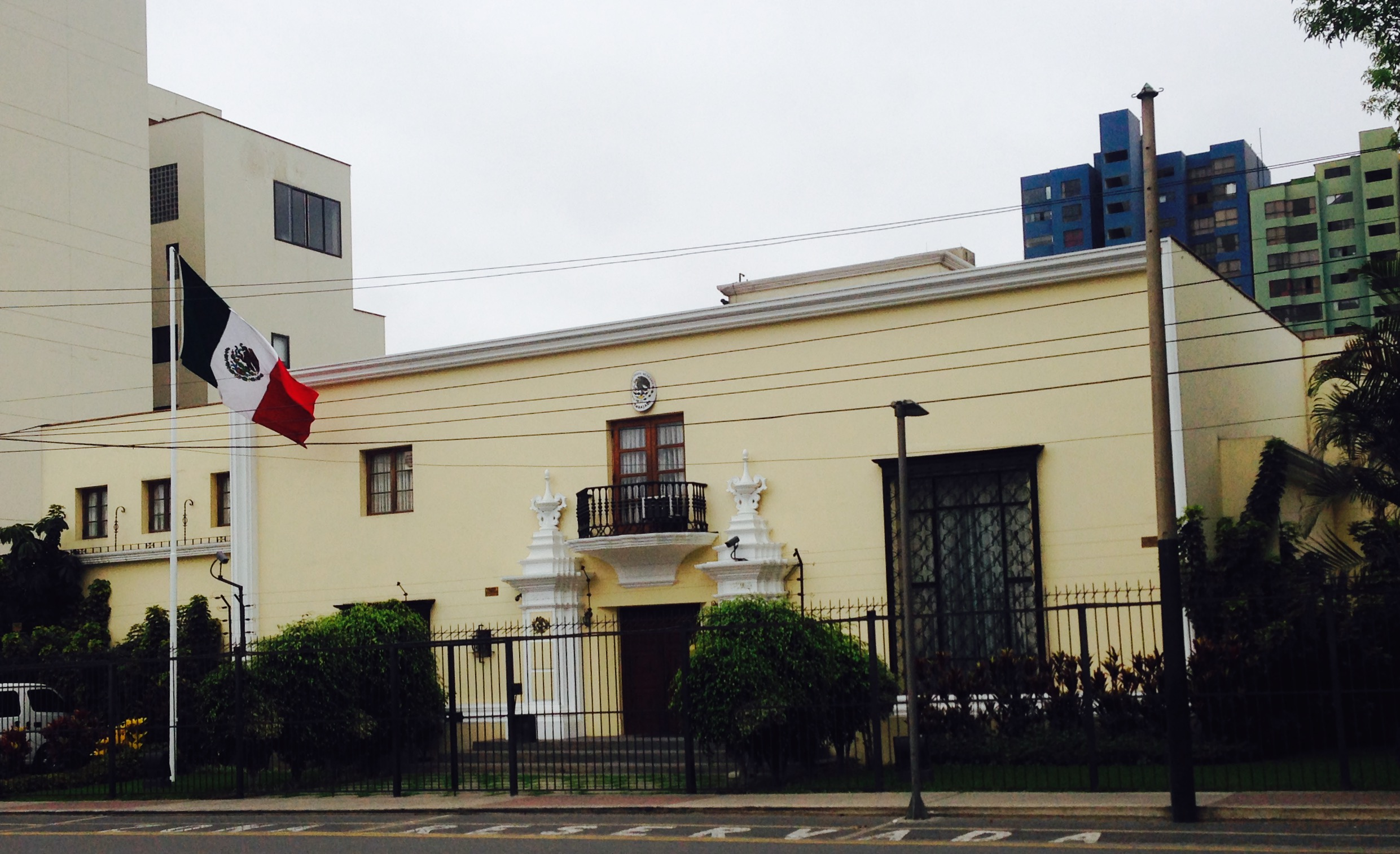
Embassy of Mexico in Lima

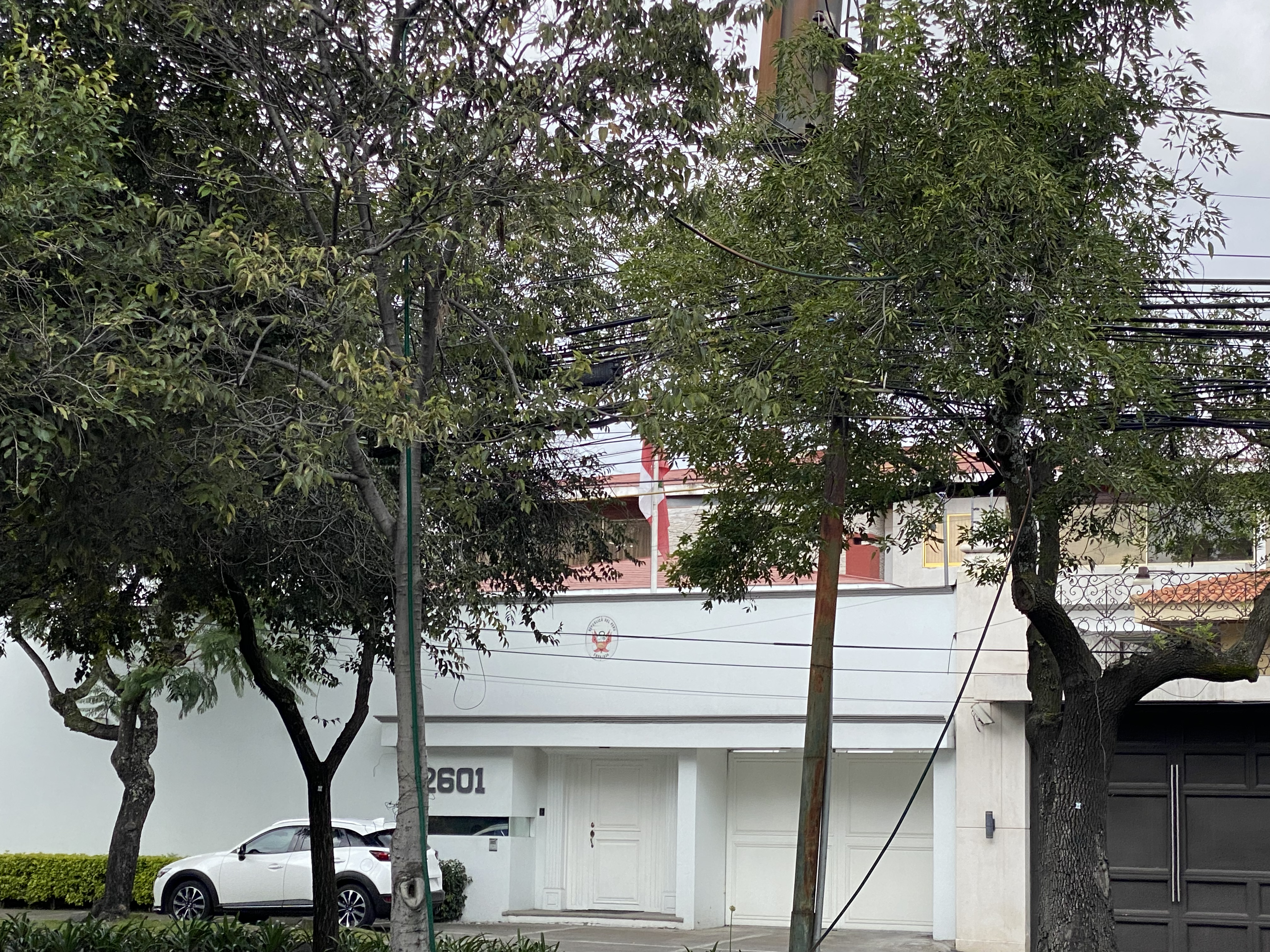
Embassy of Peru in Mexico City

== Gallery ==
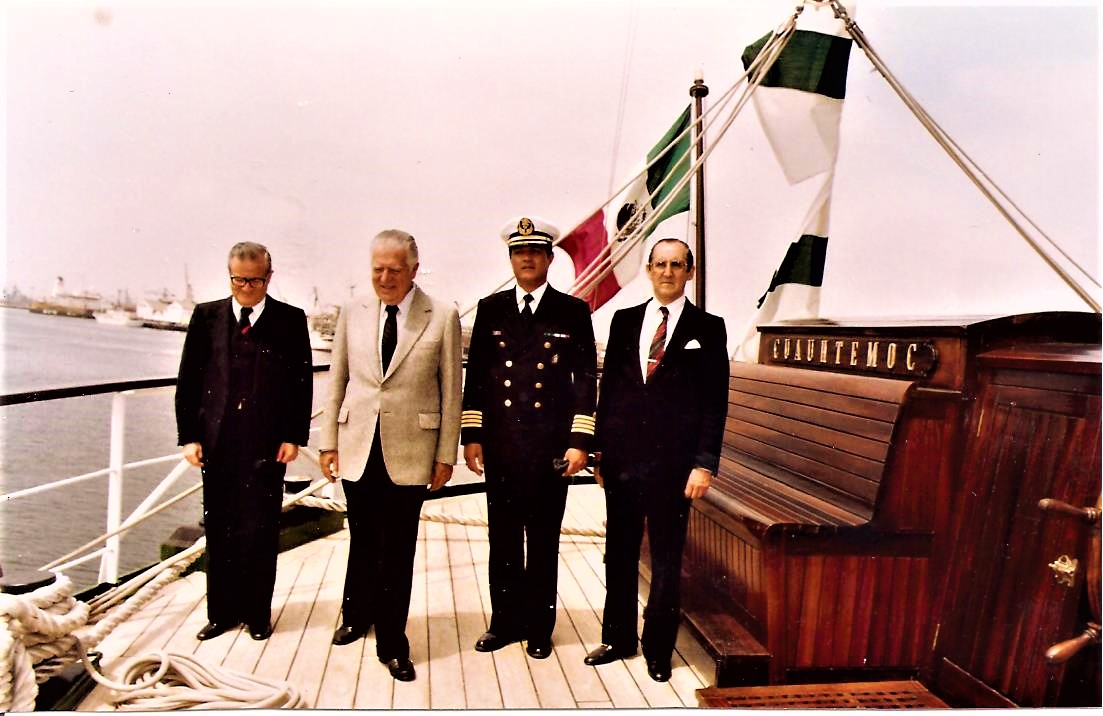
Peruvian President Fernando Belaúnde onboard the ARM Cuauhtémoc in Lima

The signing of bilateral military cooperation between Peru and Mexico

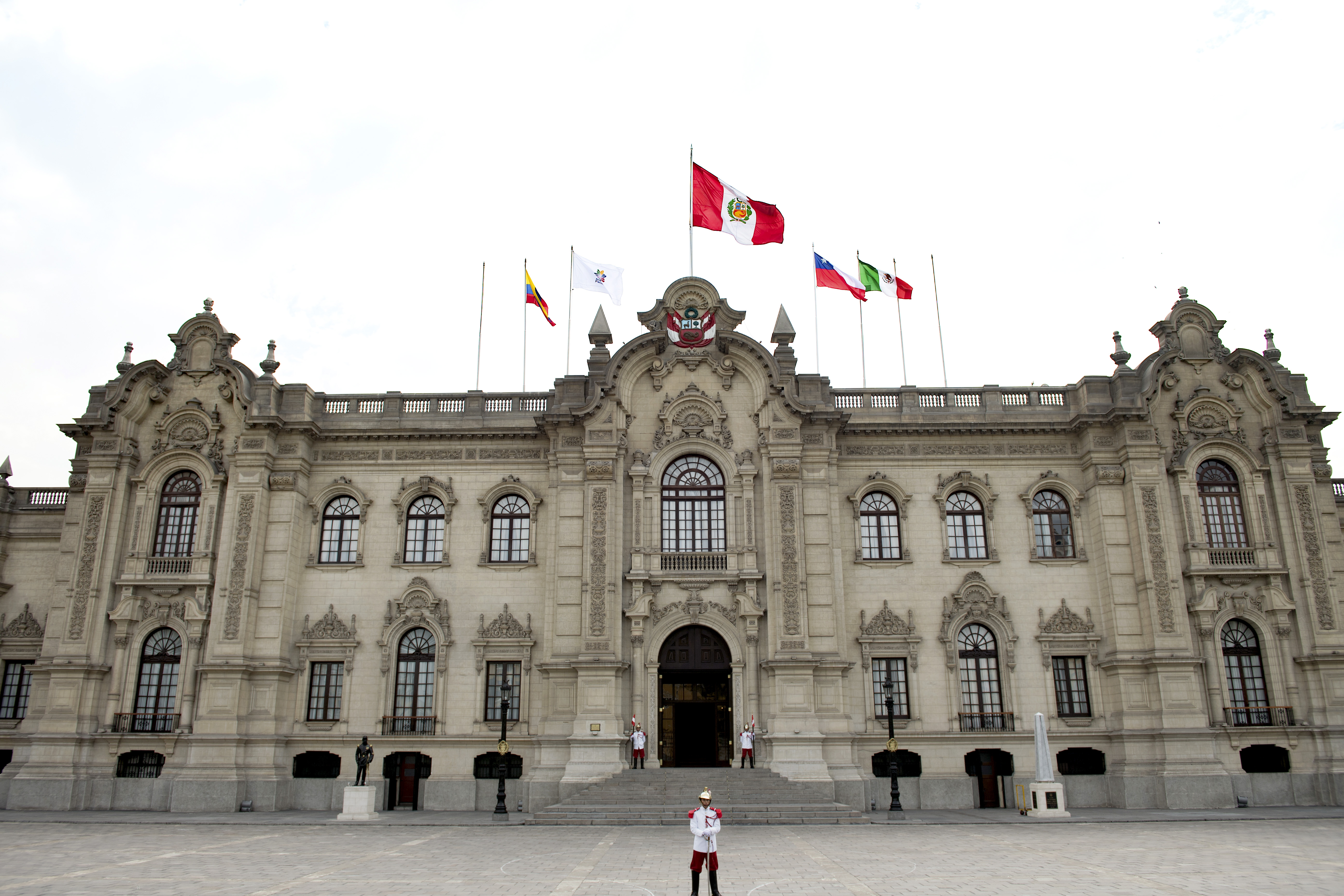
Presidential Palace of Peru flying the flags of the member states of the Pacific Alliance

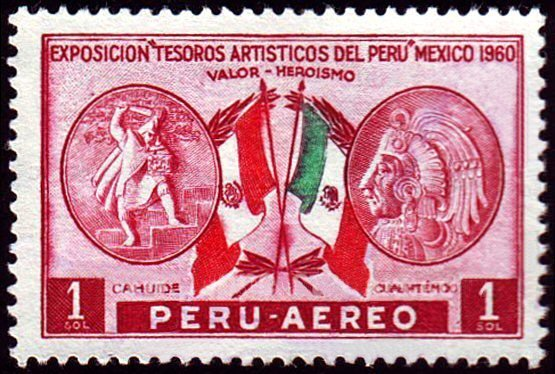
Mexico-Peru stamp

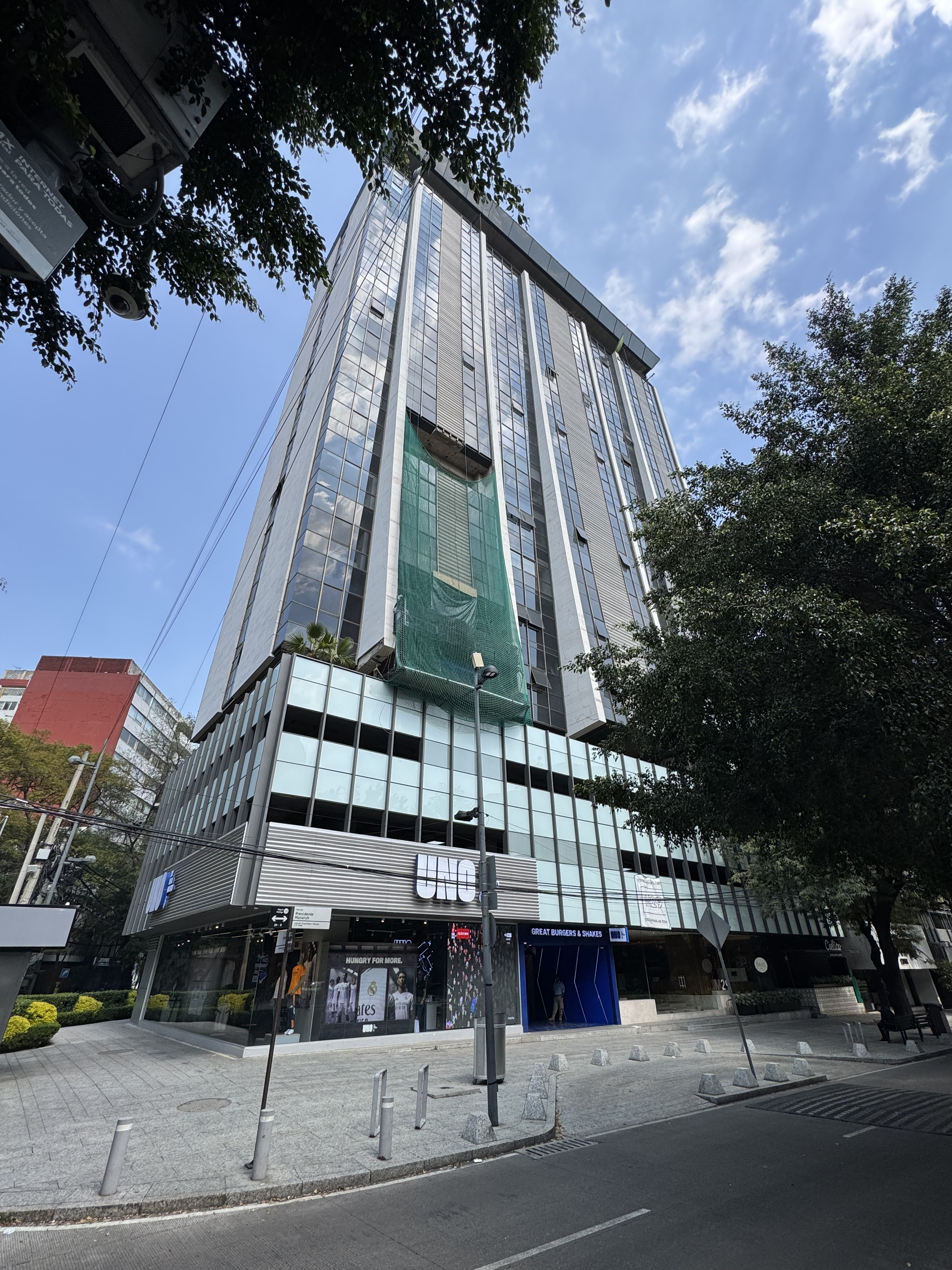
Building hosting the Consulate-General of Peru in Mexico City

Residence of the Ambassador of Mexico in Lima

== See also ==
- Peruvian Mexicans
- List of ambassadors of Mexico to Peru
- List of ambassadors of Peru to Mexico
