= Moisés Sáenz =

Mexican educationist

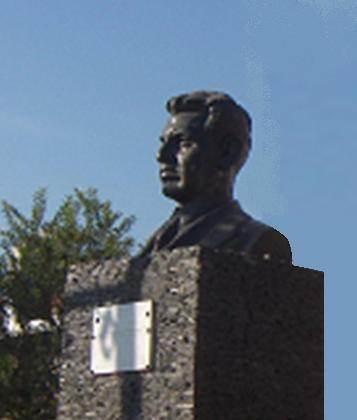
Bust of Prof Moises Saenz Garza (1888-1941) Outside the No. 10 Secondary School in Monterrey Mexico. Moises Sans was the precursor of Secondary teaching in Mexico.

Moisés Sáenz Garza (1888–1941) was a Mexican leading education advocate and reformer of education in Mexico during the first half of the 20th century. Many of the philosophies and programs that Sáenz introduced during his tenure as Sub-Secretary for the Secretariat of Public Education in the 1920s came from the influences of his mentor, John Dewey.

== Early life ==
Moisés Sáenz was born in 1888 in the northern Mexican town of Monterrey. His family was one of the relatively few Protestant families in Mexico at the time, something which had a strong influence on the path Sáenz's life would take. Moisés had a brother, Aaron, who also rose to prominence in post-Revolutionary Mexico, first as a politician (he served as Secretary of Foreign Affairs, Secretary of Public Education and Governor of Nuevo León) and later as a sugar baron known to some as the “king of Mexican sugar.”

== Early education ==
As a member of a Protestant family, Sáenz was strongly influenced by the strong education tradition set by Protestant missionaries, starting in the late 1820s. Because each Protestant was expected to be able to read the Bible on his or her own, literacy was an essential skill. A major feature of this effort was the founding of schools, in both urban and rural areas, which allowed local children to gain access to a quality education that often would otherwise have been inaccessible.

The majority of Sáenz's childhood education took place at the hands of Protestant missionaries. His elementary school years were spent in his hometown of Monterrey from 1896-1902. He them moved to the Coyoacán Preparatory School for Boys in Mexico City in 1903, where he remained until 1908.

== Higher education ==
After graduating from Coyoacán at age 20, Sáenz obtained a teaching credential before moving to the United States to further his education in 1909.

Once in the United States, Sáenz remained within the Protestant educational sphere. He attended Protestant-affiliated Washington & Jefferson College in Washington, Pennsylvania. After graduating from Washington and Jefferson, Sáenz began his post-graduate studies across the Atlantic at the University of Paris before returning to the United States to pursue his doctorate at Columbia University.

== Influence of John Dewey ==
At Columbia, he met John Dewey, who became a mentor to Sáenz and helped to shape many of the theories and policies Sáenz would pursue throughout his professional career.

John Dewey was a prominent American philosopher, psychologist, and educator in the early to mid-20th century. Although he is now known better for his work in philosophy, he was no less influential in the area of education, and, in fact, his work in the two areas often overlapped. He was a leader of the “progressive” education movement. His philosophical ideas emphasized the importance of the community, something which carried over to his thoughts on education. He believed effective schools should also be agents of socialization for the students, preparing them for and integrating them into society. He also advocated for more creative and flexible types of educational instruction rather than more traditional, rigid forms, placing a premium upon activity within the learning environment. Dewey's theories came to be classified under the label of “pragmatism;” they were, theoretically, pragmatically preparing students to be independent, productive members of society. Dewey's ideas gained him a devoted following that stretched beyond the borders of the United States; among their ranks was Moisés Sáenz.

== Education policy ==
After obtaining his doctorate from Columbia, Sáenz left Dewey and the United States to return to Mexico. There, he quickly rose up the hierarchy of the governmental education system, attaining the position of Sub-Secretary for Department of Public Education by 1925 under the post-Revolutionary presidency of Plutarco Elías Calles (his term would also carry over to Emilio Portes Gil’s presidency).

Once installed in this influential position, Sáenz began to implement a series of reforms, many of which bore unmistakable signs of Dewey's influence. Perhaps most concretely, he served as the driving force for the creation of a network of schools known as secundarias, or secondary schools. This was a vast expansion of what might be characterized as basic education in Mexico; it allowed many more Mexicans to have the ability to attend school past the fourth grade than had ever been possible before.

Sáenz also helped to create a systemic emphasis upon rural education in Mexico. For most of its history to this point, especially under Porfirio Díaz and his positivist-oriented government, Mexican education had been strongly centered around urban areas; the cities had the best schools and teachers and the most resources in far higher concentrations than did their rural counterparts. In fact, rural schools were largely ignored. Much of rural Mexico was, at best, an uncomfortable fit with the modernized society the positivist government wished to create, and therefore the Díaz government tended to marginalize it in very significant ways. One of these, perhaps the most damaging, was educational negligence, simply ignoring the needs of rural schools or even failing to create or maintain schools in rural areas at all.

This changed once men like Moisés Sáenz began to shape education policy following the Mexican Revolution. The secundaria system's inclusion of and even emphasis on rural areas was the most obvious result of this emphasis, but it was far from the only one. After the implementation of Sáenz's policies, rural education in Mexico improved significantly; the number of rural Mexicans who received at least a basic education rose dramatically, as evidenced by skyrocketing literacy rates, among other improvements.

This was Sáenz's contribution to the shaping of post-Revolutionary Mexico; the increased basic level of education it granted to the average Mexican helped the country to modernize and adapt to the changing world around it. The access and quality of education allowed by the system Sáenz helped create may be a difference between pre- and post-Revolutionary Mexico.

== Indigenous policy ==
A great deal of Sáenz's education policy ideology, and his political beliefs in general, was concerned with the relationship of society to its indigenous peoples. Specifically, he subscribed to a version of the old Liberal idea of assimilation, but with a twist. Rather than forcing Indians to abandon their old culture to adapt to modern society, he wanted to see modern society make some concessions to fit the indigenous peoples. He saw education as the most promising avenue to implement this assimilation (ironically enough, this combined a program Porfirio Díaz supported, assimilation, with one he essentially ignored, rural education).

This belief is rooted in Sáenz's idea, drawn from the influence of John Dewey, of the school as an agent of socialization. With this as one of the bases of his policies, this is a logical conclusion; if, after all, the school really is the main factor in preparing for a successful integration into society, it is therefore the place where assimilation into society must occur if at all possible. Therefore, Sáenz's expansion of and emphasis on rural schooling, particularly in areas with high numbers of indigenous residents, served a dual purpose; as promised after the Revolution, it served to expand access to and quality of education outside of the main urban areas, but it also allowed this program of assimilation to actually reach the people it was targeted towards. In this way, Sáenz's views on education and the relationship between modern society and its indigenous population are inseparably linked; neither would have existed in precisely the same way without the other.

However, as mentioned earlier, Sáenz's assimilation was not meant to be a one-way street, at least in theory (Palacios, 1988). Schools were intended to turn indigenous boys and girls into ordinary members of Mexican society, yes, but Mexican society was supposed to adapt and incorporate some elements of indigenous culture, as well. Unfortunately for Sáenz, this was far less successful than his expansion of rural education; it proved to be far more difficult to implement a successful system of two-way cultural assimilation than it was to reform, expand, and improve the school system, and only limited progress was made toward Sáenz's goals in this area in the immediate aftermath of the implementation of his policies.

== Ambassadorship to Peru and death ==
After completing his run as Sub-Secretary for Public Education in 1930, Sáenz was rewarded with an appointment as Mexico's ambassador to Peru. In October 1941, Moisés Sáenz died of pneumonia while still stationed in Lima.

== Legacy ==
He left behind a strong legacy in the fields of diplomacy, indigenous relations, and education. In his period of service to the Mexican government, inspired by his Protestant background and education, he significantly expanded the scale and quantity of the Mexican education system, transforming it from what was almost a sham of a system under the regime of Porfirio Díaz before the Mexican Revolution into one that produced one of the highest literacy rates in the world in a very short period of time. He also led the way in formulating Mexico's indigenous strategy, drawing on the philosophy and teachings of John Dewey to combine an assimilation program with the rapidly expanding education system, thus ensuring it reached its targets, while also advocating a more open and flexible form of acculturation, one that tried to learn from indigenous culture. In what would prove to be the final years of his life, Sáenz served Mexico as an able diplomat.

Sáenz sought for Mexicans an understanding of the Mexican Revolution that de-emphasized factional struggles and the "cult of martyrs" for one emphasizing unity of revolutionaries and the Revolution as a great event. In 1929, he articulated the important idea of that for Mexicans there was a difference "between the Revolution with a capital [letter] and revolutions with a small letter."

Although his name is less famous than contemporaries such as José Vasconcelos, Moisés Sáenz was arguably just as influential in formulating post-Revolutionary Mexico.
