= Mario H. Gottfried Gutiérrez =

Mexican businessman

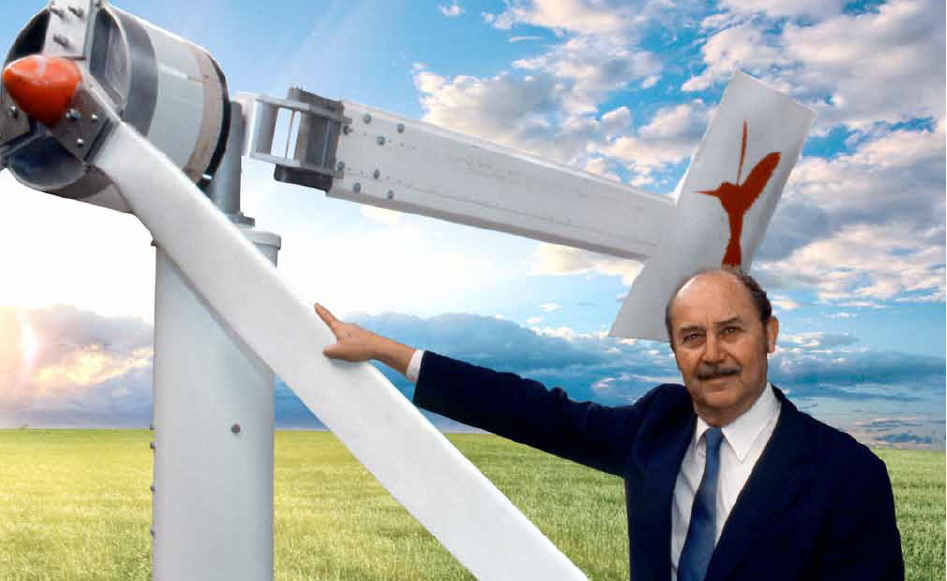
- Mario H. Gottfried in 1976, besides the "Hummingbird" or "Colibrí", the first Mexican wind turbine.
- Born: September 7, 1919; Mexico City, Mexico
- Died: November 2, 1999 (aged 80); Mexico City, Mexico
- Occupation: Mexican businessman.

Mario Héctor Gottfried Gutiérrez (September 7, 1919 – November 2, 1999,) was a businessman in the Mexican electric industry, and captain of the Air Force of the United States. He founded several Mexican companies, including Reliance de Mexico, S.A. de C.V., and Potencia Industrial, S.A.

== Early years ==
His father, Enrique Guillermo Gottfried Zender, born in Peru to American parents, was an electrical engineer who had come to Mexico City in 1910 with the Westinghouse Company from Pittsburgh, Pennsylvania. In 1918, he married Maria Gutiérrez Zertuche, a Mexican citizen, whose parents and grandparents were officers of the Mexican Army.

During his early years, Mario Gottfried attended the American School in Mexico City. Later, his father was offered a job in the German Siemens Electrical Company in the US, and the family moved in 1926 to New York City, where he grew up until the age of twenty-one.

== Military career ==
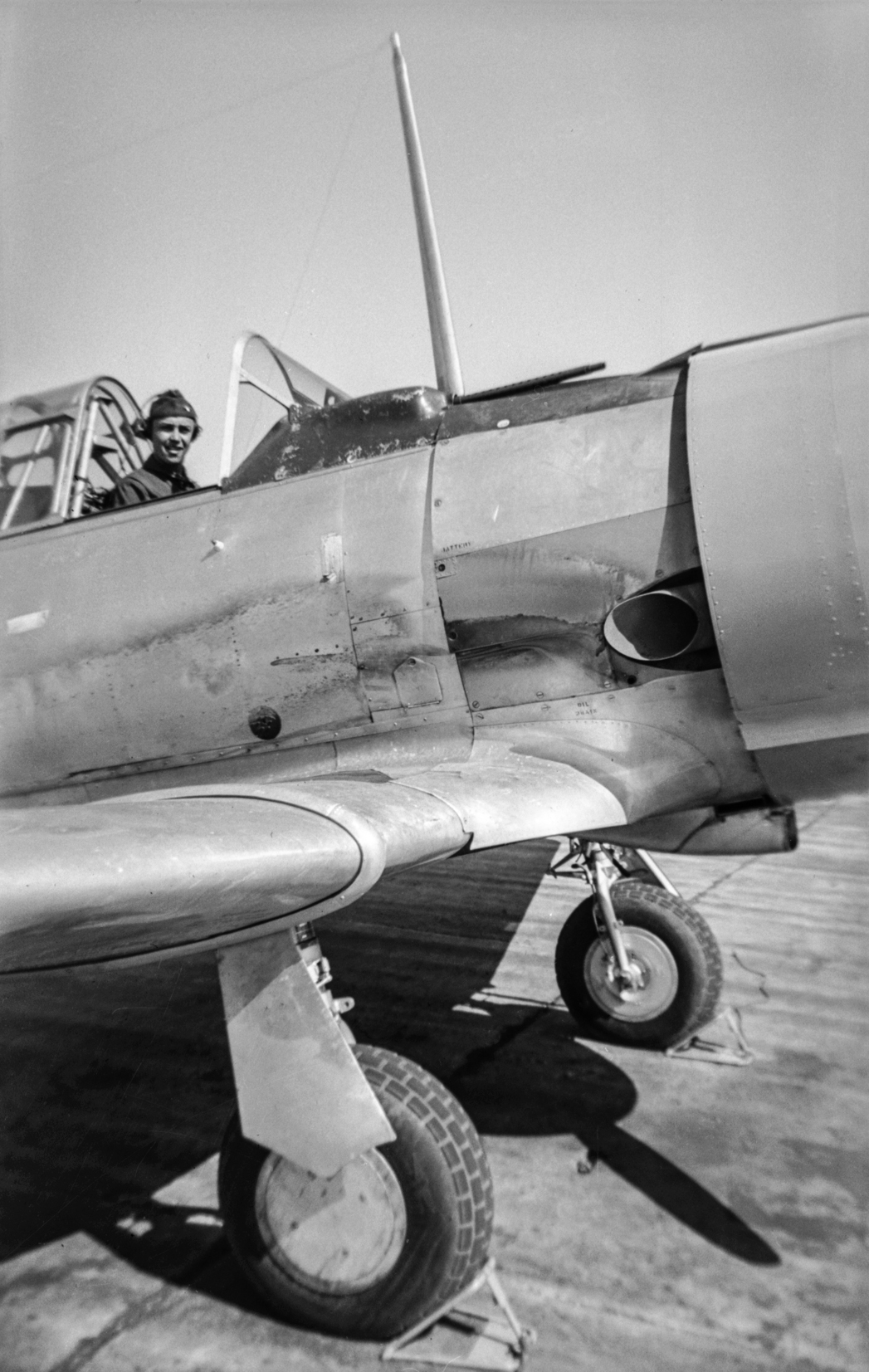
Mario Gottfried during his flight training in 1942.

In 1940, while attending Pratt Institute of Technology in New York, he applied to enter the USA Army Air Corps. Meanwhile, in early 1941, he joined the Army Infantry Center at Camp Upton, in Long Island, and at Camp Eustis, Virginia. During a stopover at Fort Shafter, Hawaii, on the way to the Philippines, he received his acceptance into the aviation cadet training program at Allan Hancock College of Aeronautics in Santa Maria, California. During his training at Air Force Bases in Merced, California, and Luke, Arizona, he used to fly BT-13s, P-36s and P-40s, for graduating later as a fighter pilot in April 1942.

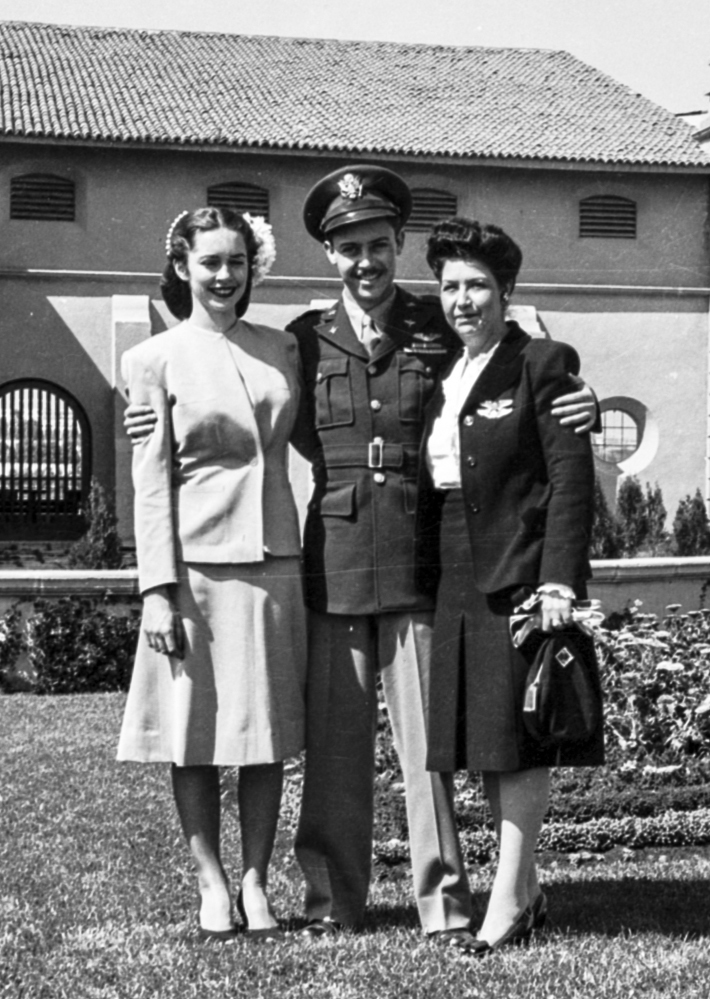
Martha Joy Young, Mario Gottfried and María Gutiérrez Zertuche, in 1945.

He served in Alaska 11th Fighter Squadron and, between 1942 and 1943, was continually transferred between the 42 º and 54 º Troop Carrier Squadrons. Gottfried logged over one thousand hours of flight time during his missions in places like Naknek, Nome, Bethel, Dutch Harbor and the Aleutian Islands in the C45 (DC3). In 1943, he was awarded the Air Medal and Distinguished Flying Cross at the Elmendorf AFB, Alaska, for his great performance as a transport pilot in the Aleutian Islands during World War II.

Between 1944 and 1945, he was assigned to different U.S. Air Force Bases: Baer Field, Indiana; Grenada, Mississippi; Bergstrom in Austin, Texas; and then to Sedalia, Missouri. During his service in Sedalia, while he was instructor of instructors, he met Martha Joy Young and got married on January 29, 1945, in Glendale, Arizona. In late 1945, he retired from the U.S. Air Force, although years later he became president of the Air Force Reserve Officer Association in Mexico City and an active member of the Air Force Association.

== Business career ==
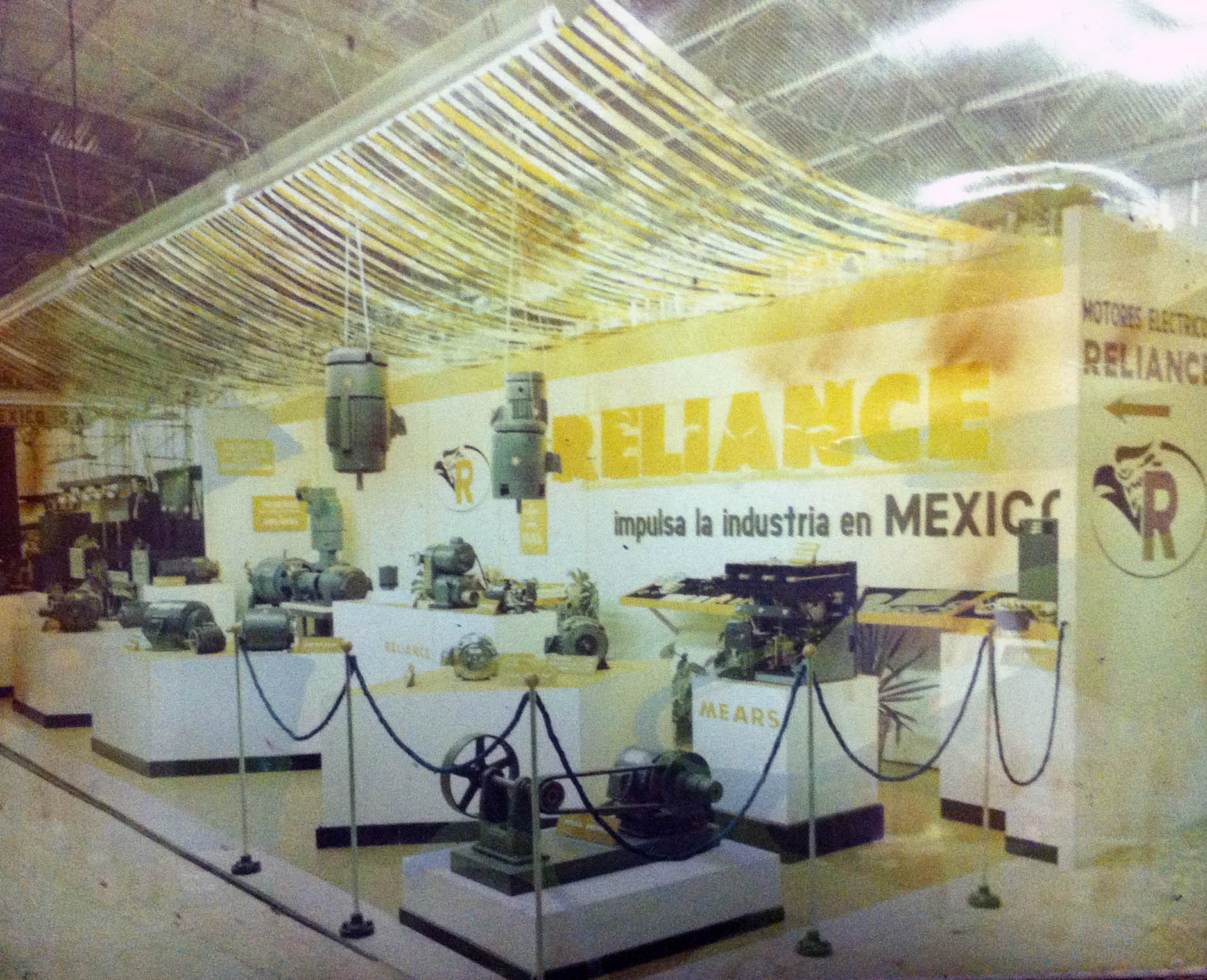
First exhibition of Reliance de Mexico, S.A. de C.V., in 1962.

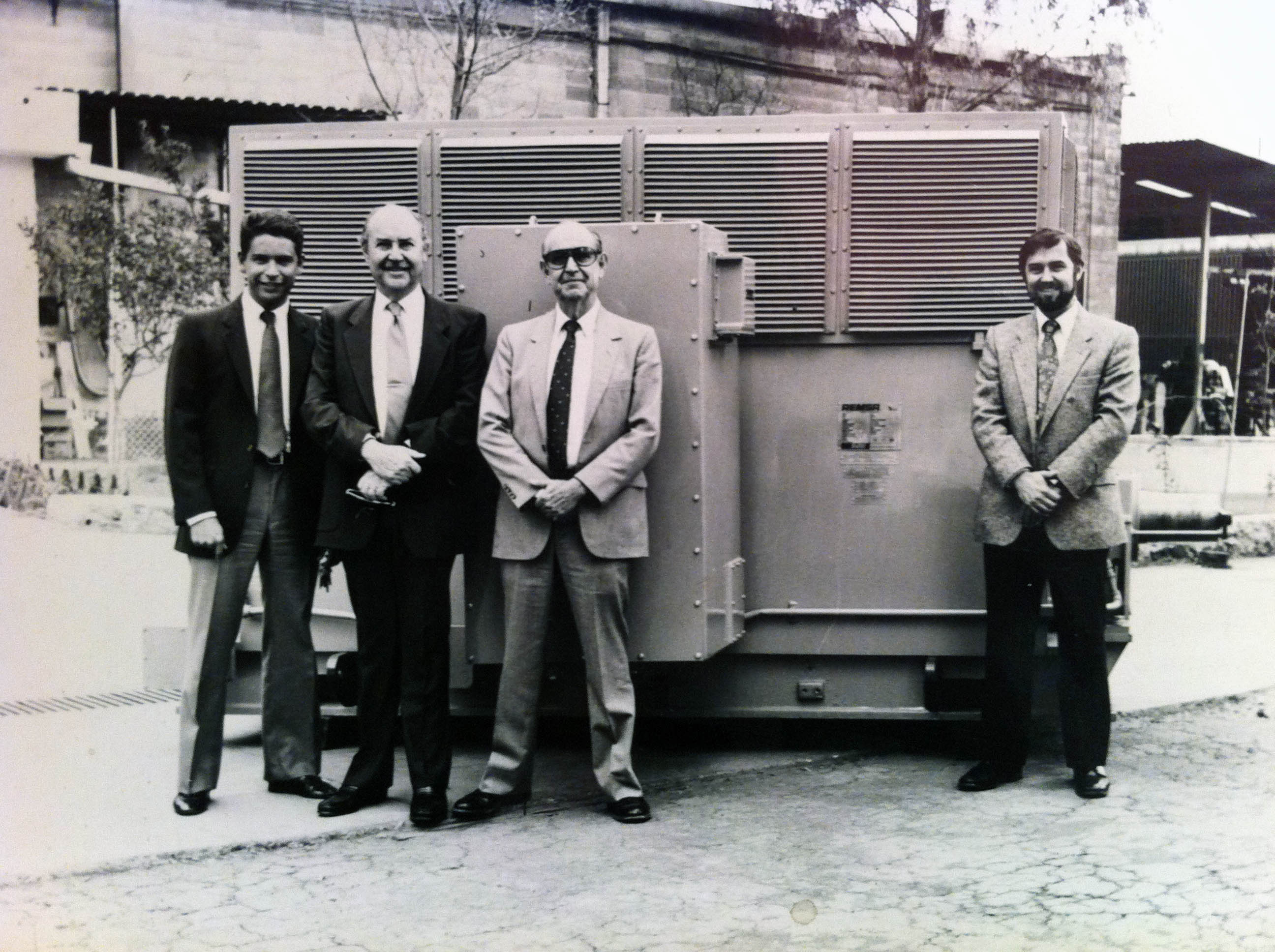
Gustavo Gottfried (son), Mario H. Gottfried, Gustavo Gottfried and Carlos F. Gottfried Gottfried, in front of one of the 6500 HP electric motor, manufactured by Reliance de México, S.A.

In 1945, Mario Gottfried moved to Mexico City, where he collaborated with the business plan of his father, Enrique Gottfried, now a representative of American electrical manufacturers in Mexico. After the preliminary success, in 1958 they began to manufacture electric motors and generators as Reliance de Mexico, S.A., under the supervision of the Reliance Electric Company of Cleveland, Ohio. His brother, Gustavo C. Gottfried, also ex-aviator of World War II, joined them.

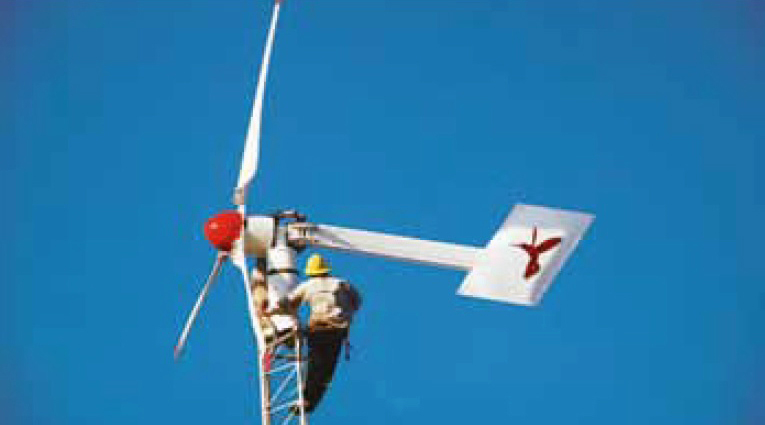
Placement of a "Colibrí".

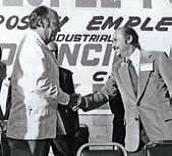
President José López Portillo with Mario H. Gottfried Gutiérrez, at the inauguration of the new factory, Potencia Industrial, S.A., in 1976.

In 1968 they produced more power-generating equipment as Potencia Industrial, S.A., and in the early 70's, his children Mario and Carlos joined the company. Years later, the firm grew from making small motors of 1 to 50 horsepower (HP), to huge industrial motors and generators up to 10,000 HP. The enterprise also became a benchmark for wind and hydro-power industry, and uninterruptible power systems, after several patents in these technologies; as in the case of the "Hummingbird" or "Colibrí", a permanent magnet generator of 5 and 10 kilowatts (kW), in commerce since 1975. According to various publications, is "the first Mexican wind turbine, besides being a global pioneer in permanent magnet direct drive generators." By 1980, close to 600 units were exported to the United States and Canada.

The company, led by Mario Gottfried, continued to thrive in their operations until 1982, when the initial achievements were threatened by a severe financial crisis in Mexico that affected the industrial sector, which became even more acute with the process of economic aperture in 1988. The company manages to survive and in the early nineties continued to push ahead with manufacturing innovations, and celebrating contracts with recognized companies, such as Electric Products Company of Cleveland, Ohio; Alternative Energy Institute (AEI); Louis Allis Company of Milwaukee, Wisconsin; Zond and Enron Wind; Federal Electricity Commission (CFE); Petróleos Mexicanos (Pemex); and more.

Mario Gottfried died in Mexico City on November 2, 1999, at the age of 80, due to a brain tumor.

== Family ==
His wife, the prominent landscape painter, Martha Joy Gottfried, died on January 10, 2014.

Mario H. Gottfried had 4 children. Mario Héctor, María Elena, Carlos Federico and Martha Cecilia. One of them, Carlos Gottfried Joy, is now president of Potencia Industrial, S.A.

== Publications ==
The ABC of theory and application of polyphase electric motors in industry, 1983, coauthored with G.L. Oscarson, Grupo Fuerza.

== Military awards ==
- In 1943 he receives Air medal and Distinguished Flying Cross at the Elmendorf AFB, Alaska.

== Business awards ==
- In 1984, Reliance of Mexico, SA, is an active member of the National Confederation of the Mexican Republic (COPARMEX).
- In 1993, Reliance of Mexico, S.A., receives Certificate of Reliable Supplier by Petróleos Mexicanos (PEMEX).
- In 1998, Reliance of Mexico, S.A, joined the National Accreditation System for Testing Laboratories of the Secretary of Commerce and Industrial Development (SECOFI)
- In 1999, Potencia Industrial, S.A, received Export Award by the Government of the Mexican Federal District.
