= Raul Sáenz =

Mexican businessman

- Born: 1910; Mexico
- Died: 1982 (aged 71–72)
- Occupation: Businessman
- Known for: First owner of a Coca-Cola bottling plant in Mexico
- Spouse: Maria Eustolia Nevarez
- Children: 11

Raúl Alfonso Sáenz Meraz (1910–1982) was a Mexican Businessman and entrepreneur, the first owner of a Coca-Cola bottling plant in Mexico. The plant was based in Nuevo Casas Grandes, in Chihuahua state, bringing an income to an area of Mexico that was undergoing an economic depression.

== Career ==
He acquired magnesium mines in Sierra Tarahumara, which provided more than 5,000 men with a job. He paid higher wages than most other mines. He brought the first TV antenna to Chihuahua state, transmitting US stations, since it was closer to the border than to the Mexican stations, which were in Mexico City.

== Personal life ==
Saenz married Maria Eustolia Nevarez, a young girl from a prosperous family, and they raised 11 children: the first three were Armando, Rodolfo and Javier. They had two daughters, Teresa and Maria del Socorro.

The family was known for having the first gadgets in northern Mexico, such as a TV, a washing machine, an electric iron, or a fridge.

Raúl Saenz's offspring studied in Jesuit boarding schools, education only accessible to the rich.

He sold the bottling plant, and half of the mines. By the early 1980s most of his wealth was in the hands of one of his sons. His descendants number more than a hundred at this date.

His grandson, Raul Saenz, son of Javier Eduardo Saenz, became a defender of the rights of the Thai community in Reykjavík, Iceland. He worked for Alþjóðahús as a translator and interpreter.
