= Schloss Liechtenstein =

Schloss Liechtenstein may refer to:

- Liechtenstein Castle (Maria Enzersdorf), a castle in Maria Enzersdorf
- Schloss Liechtenstein (Maria Enzersdorf), a palace in Maria Enzersdorf
