= Schloss Liechtenstein (Maria Enzersdorf) =

Neoclassical palace in Maria Enzersdorf, near Vienna, Austria

Coordinates: 48°05′31″N 16°16′19″E

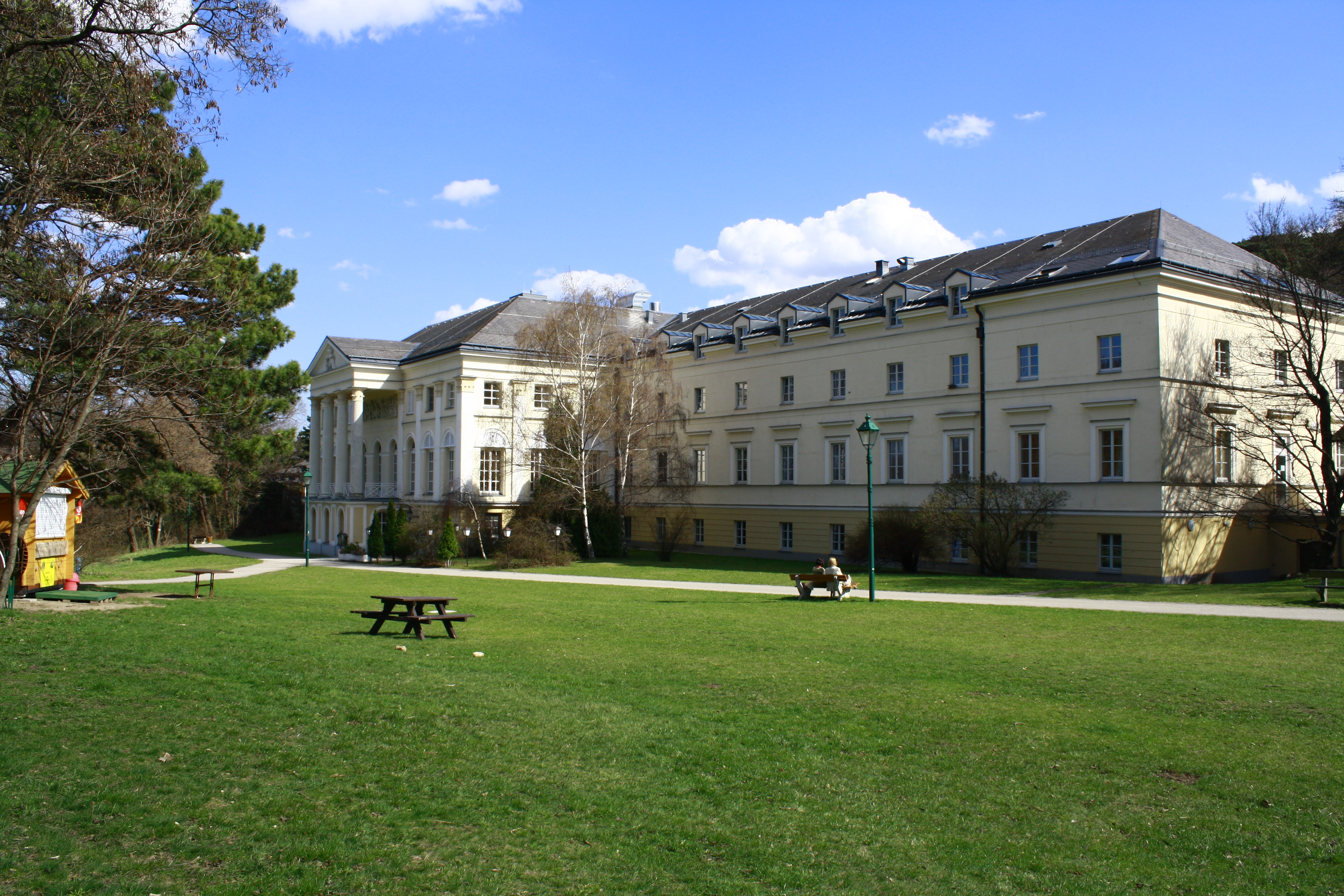
Schloss Liechtenstein - The central block is still original, the side wings are modern with a reconstructed exterior

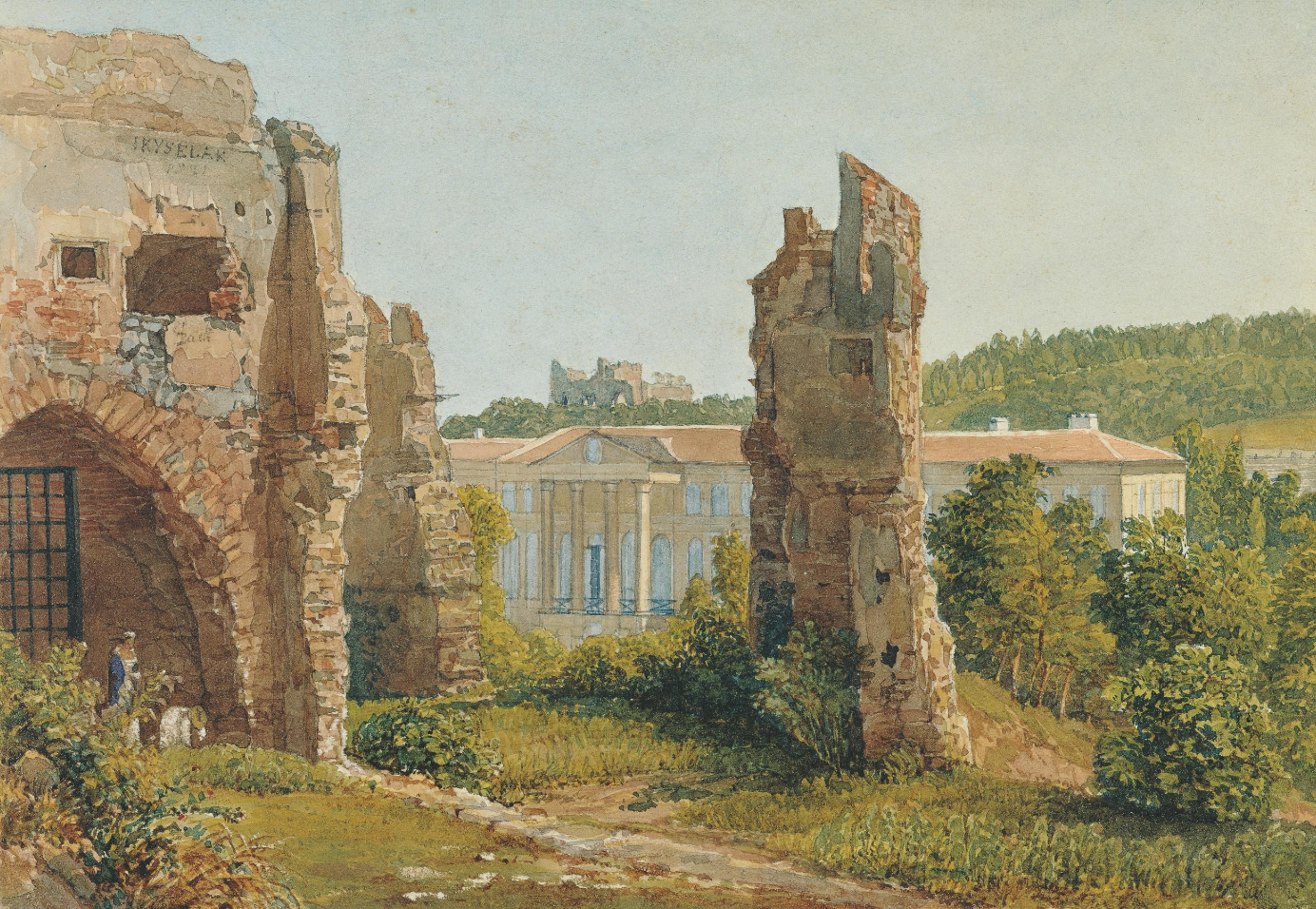
Schloss Liechtenstein and the ruins of Liechtenstein castle by Rudolf von Alt (1832)

The Liechtenstein Palace (German: Schloss Liechtenstein) is a neoclassical palace near Maria Enzersdorf (and Mödling) in Lower Austria, bordering Vienna. It is on the edge of the Vienna Woods (German: Wienerwald). It stands opposite south of Liechtenstein Castle, the ancestral seat of and place of origin of the House of Liechtenstein, the ruling family of the Principality of Liechtenstein. Prince Johann I of Liechtenstein (1760–1836) built the neoclassical palace in Biedermeier style at the start of the 19th century as one of the princely summer residences. In the aftermath of World War II, the palace fell into ruins and has been sold by the princely family.

Today, the palace (exterior) has been reconstructed and serves as a retirement centre.

== History ==
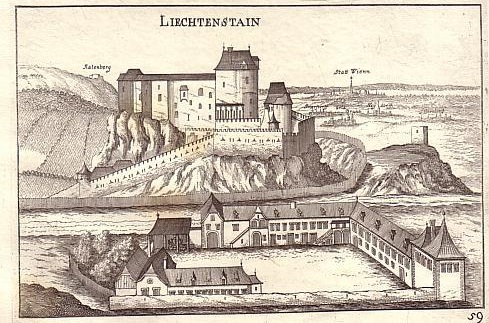
View of Liechtenstein castle with opposite the manor house and the city of Vienna in the back by Georg Matthäus Vischer (1672)

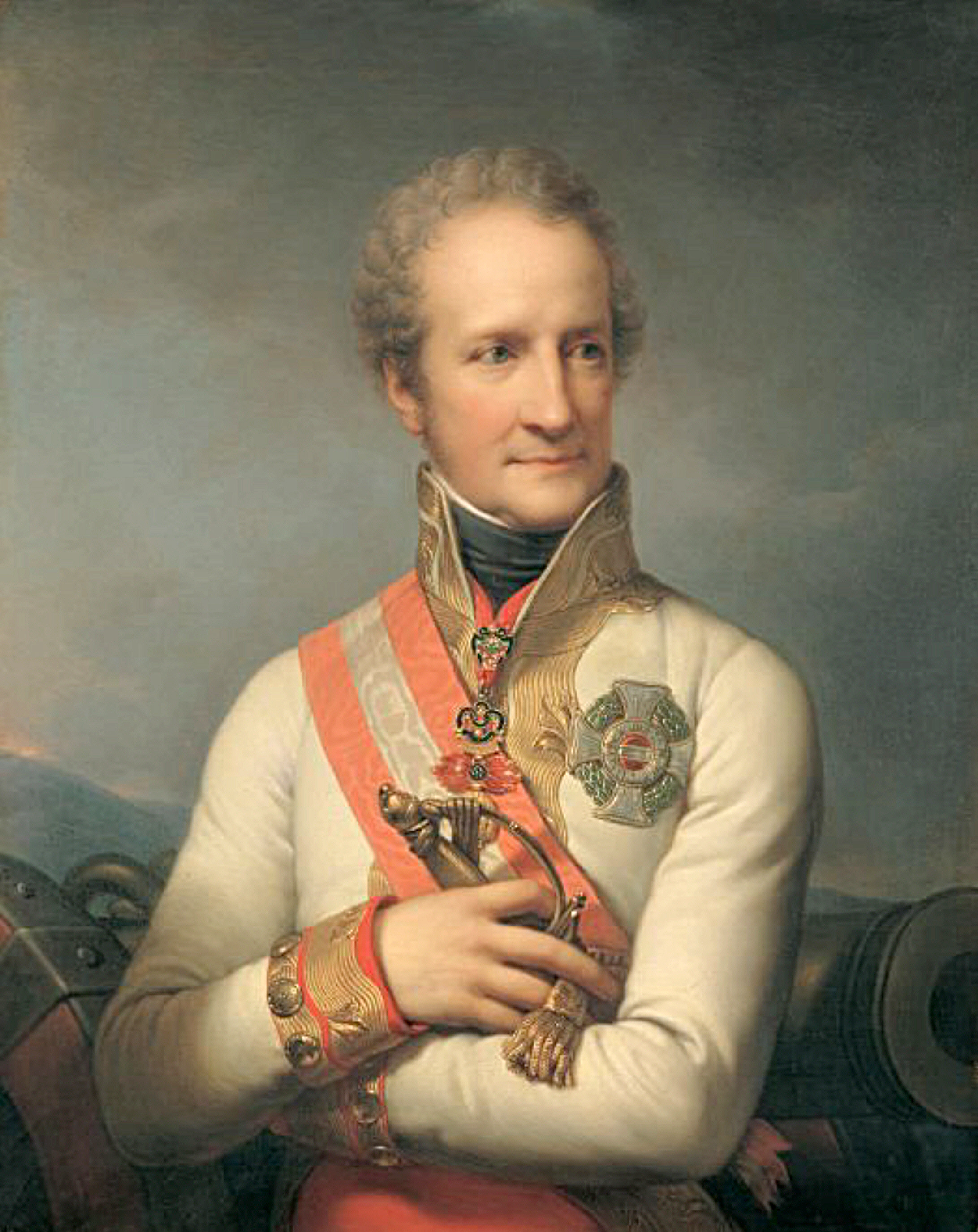
Prince Johann I of Liechtenstein (1816)

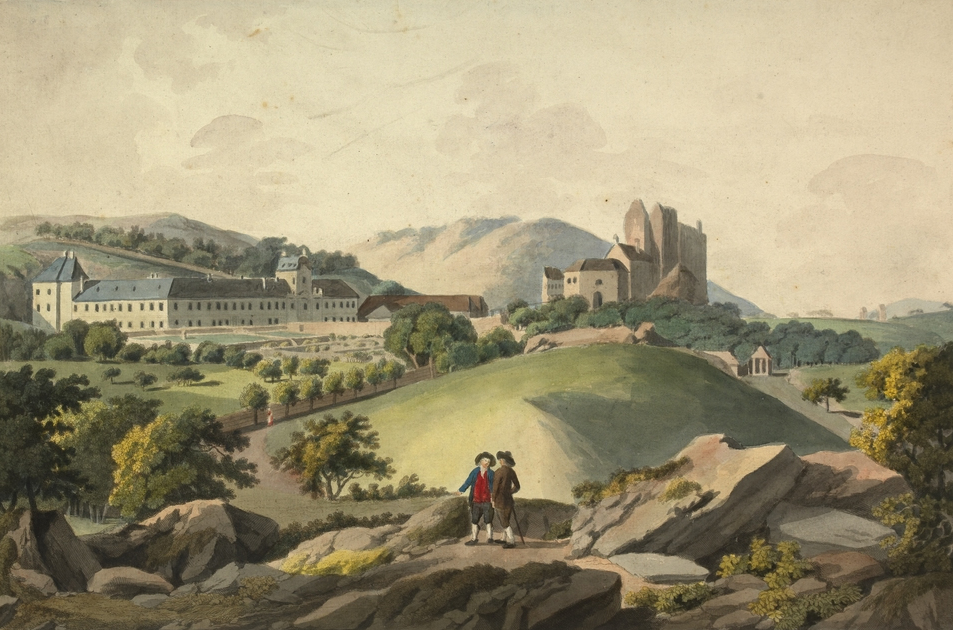
Liechtenstein castle with the baroque-style Liechtenstein palace in 1801 by Franz Xaver Stöckl

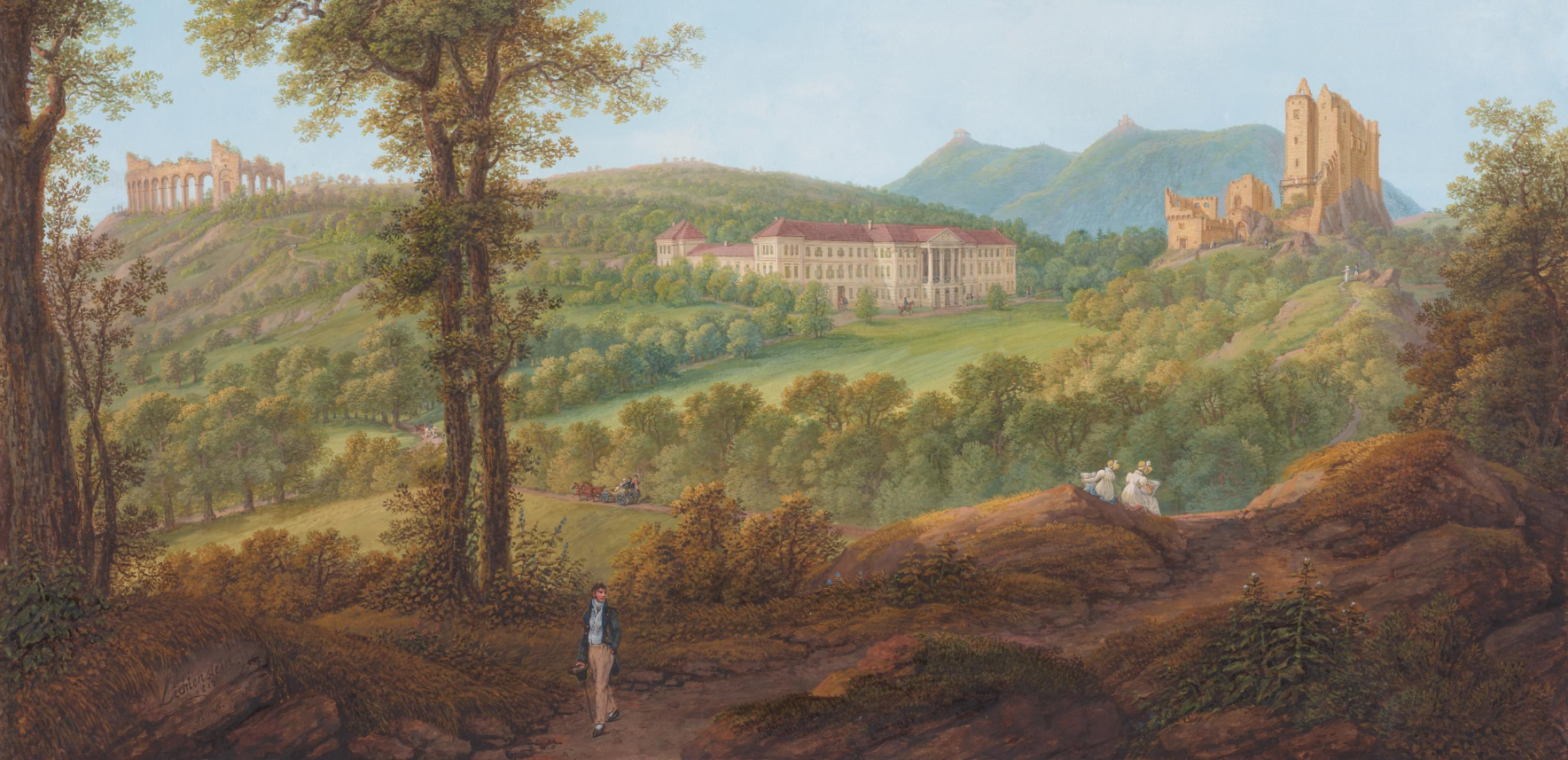
Schloss Liechtenstein, Liechtenstein castle and the surrounding landscape park with the amphitheatre in the early 19th century by Ferdinand Runk (Princely Liechtenstein Collections)

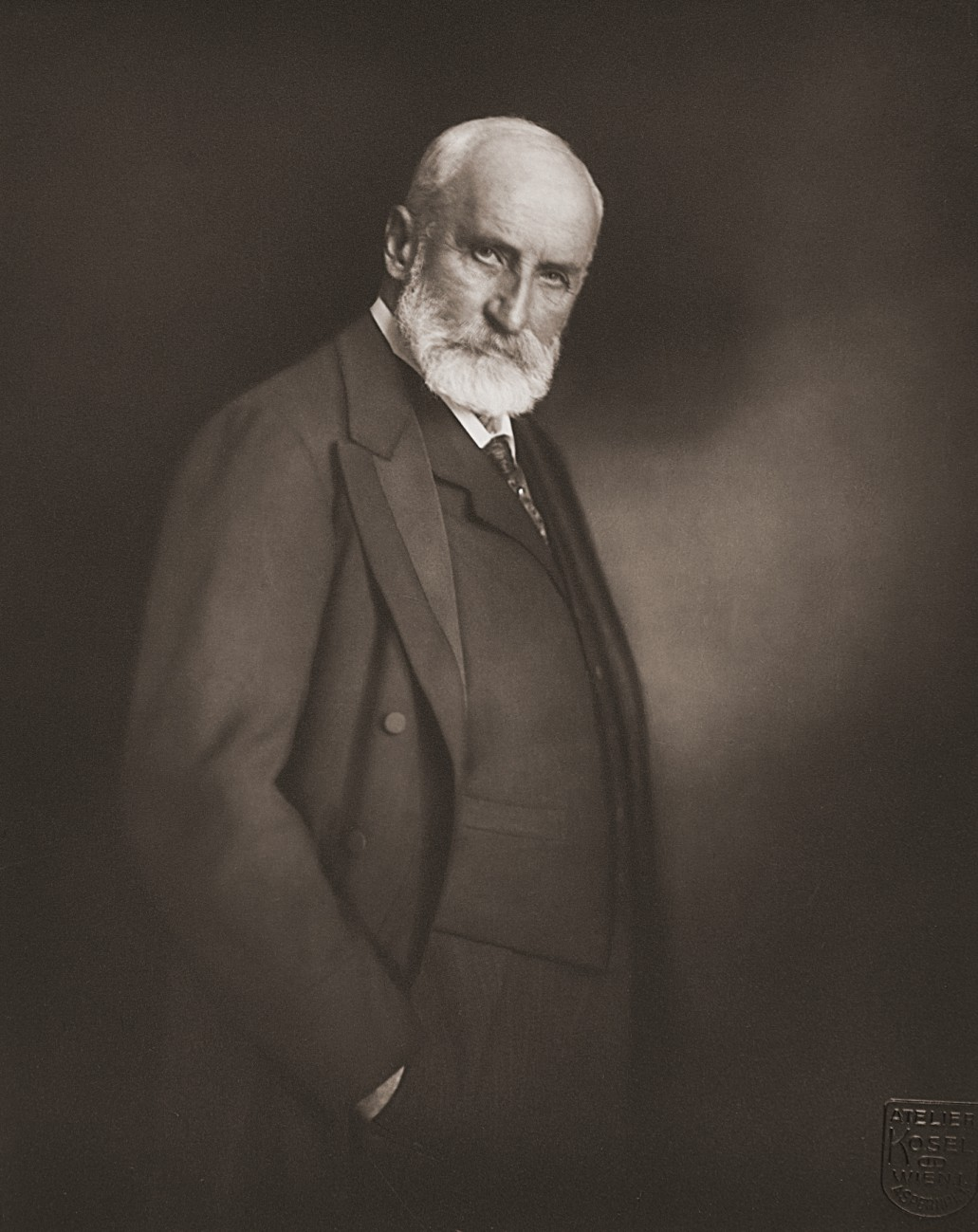
Prince Johann II of Liechtenstein (1928)

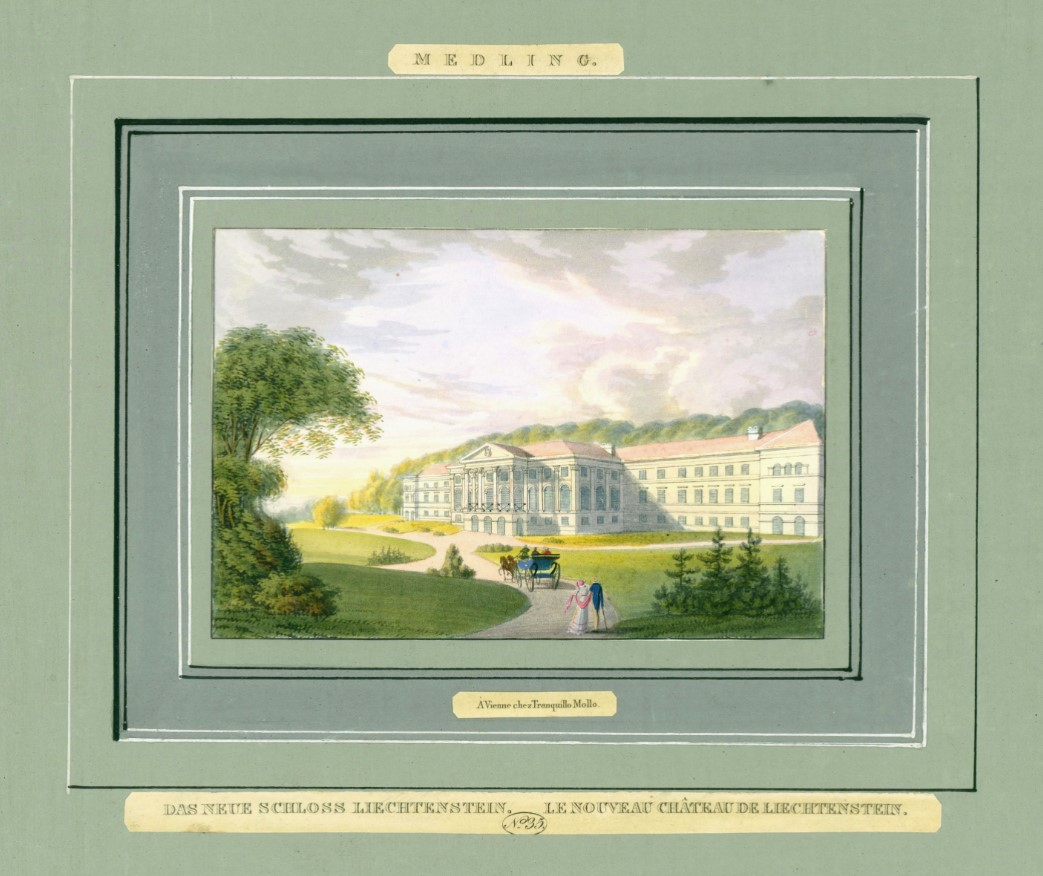
Schloss Liechtenstein around 1830 by Tranquillo Mollo

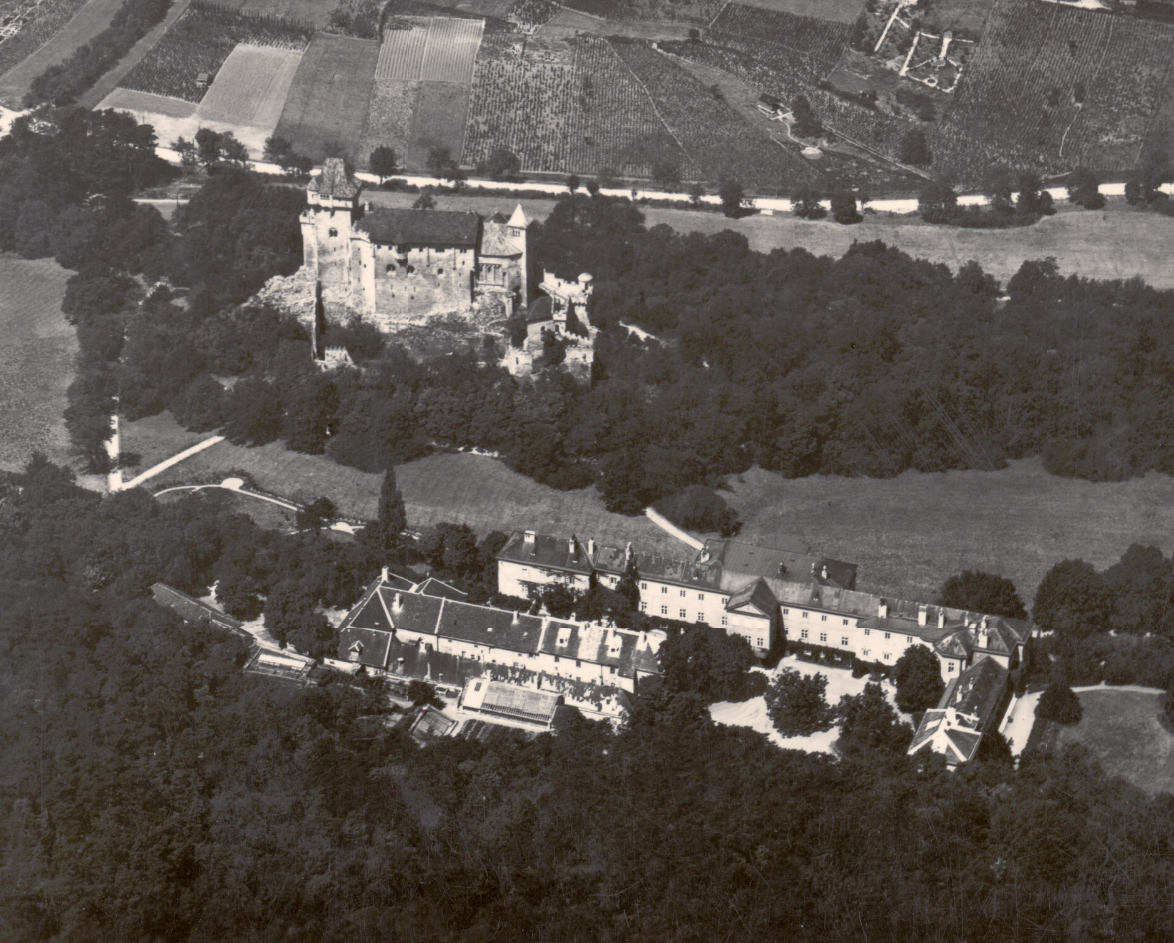
Aerial view of Schloss Liechtenstein and Liechtenstein castle around 1930

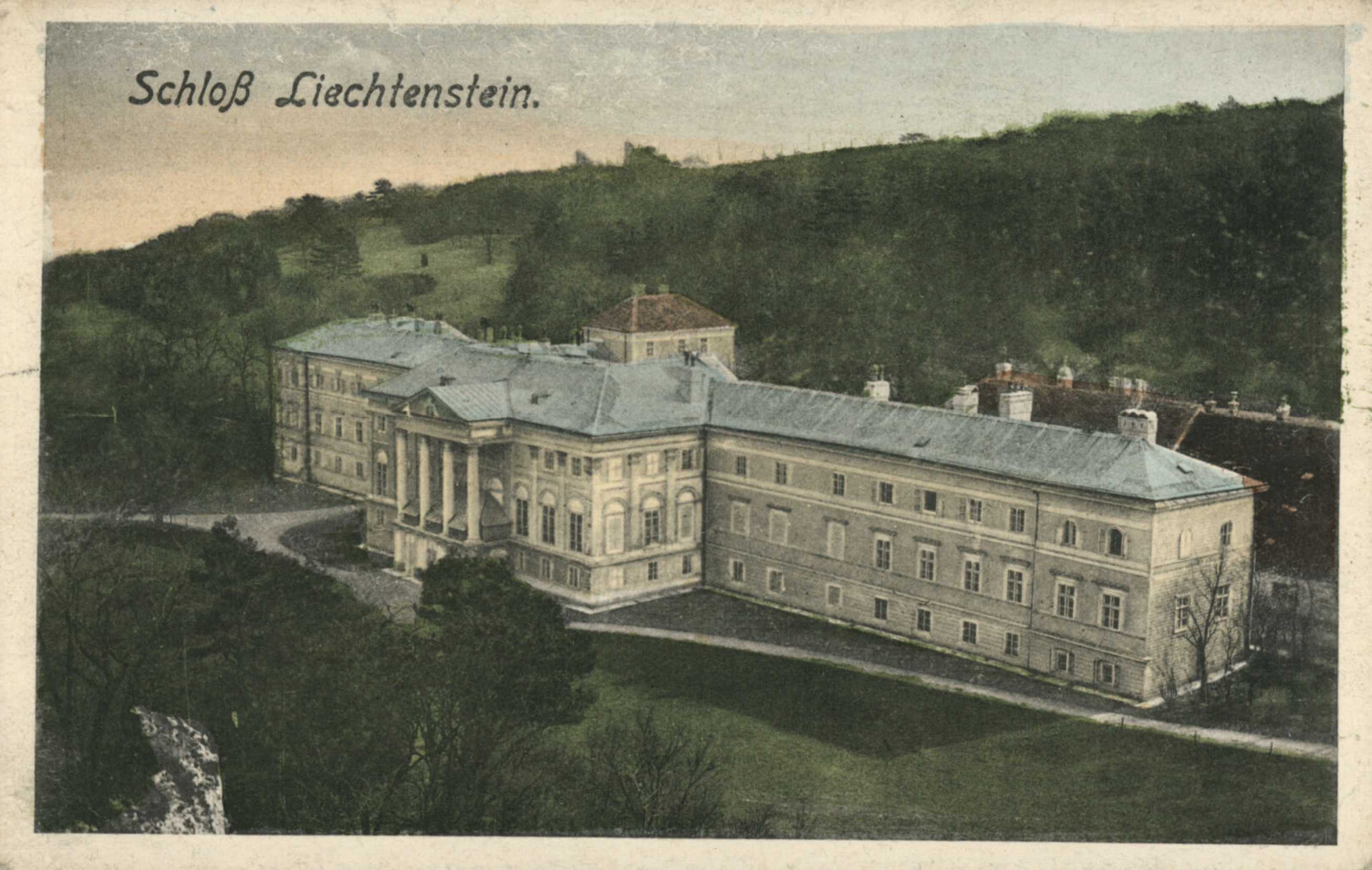
Aerial view of Schloss Liechtenstein

Liechtenstein castle was constructed in the 12th century. Initially, it was owned by the Liechtenstein family. But over time, it transferred into the hands of other noble families. At the end of the 16th century, the estate administrator, Georg Wiesing, erected a manor house at the foot of the Kalenderberg opposite Liechtenstein castle, as the castle itself was probably no longer habitable at that time.

During the Battle of Vienna in 1683, troops of the Ottoman Empire destroyed the castle and the manor house, leaving both in ruins. Rebuilding of the manor house started in 1686. In the 18th century, the manor house had become a small baroque-style palace. Ownership continued to transfer from one family to another noble family. Among these owners was the Polish prince Stanisław Poniatowski (1754–1833), a nephew of king Stanislaus Augustus of Poland (r. 1764–1795).

=== Construction of a neoclassical palace ===
Between 1807 and 1808, out of romantic enthusiasm prince Johann I of Liechtenstein bought back from prince Poniatowski the ruins of his ancestral castle and the surrounding estate. He decided to replace the baroque manor house by a new summer palace. He commissioned the architect Joseph Engel, a student of Joseph Kornhäusel, to make a design in Biedermeier style. The palace was constructed between 1820 and 1822. The façade was modeled after Weilburg Palace in Baden, the summer seat of the Teschen branch of the Habsburg family. The palace facade also has similarities with the Liechtenstein palace of Nové Zámky u Litovle (German: Neuschloss bei Littau) in Mladeč, a baroque hunting lodge neoclassically reconstructed after a fire by prince Johann I between 1806 and 1808 basis a design of the architect Joseph Hardtmuth (1758-1816).

At the same time, an English landscape garden was laid out around the castle and the palace. It was decorated with Follies such as artificial ruins and temples. Also, the first restoration measures of Liechtenstein castle were carried out by the Joseph Hardtmuth between 1808 and 1816. However, the castle remained in ruins until 1884, when it was rebuilt by architect Carl Gangolf Kayser for prince Johann II of Liechtenstein (1840–1929).

In addition, there was focus on the agricultural development of the estate as well by building a dairy and a tree nursery.

Until he died in 1836, prince Johann I was very interested in Schloss Liechtenstein and paid much attention to the palace and the gardens. He usually visited the palace in May. The entire princely family would often gather there as well. From the palace, the prince would go for long rides on his mountain pony every day. In the afternoon, he would visit the nearby surroundings. Returning after sunset, he would spend the time until supper, and often afterwards, on the balcony, always accompanied by one of his sons. Guests usually visited twice a week. Members of the Habsburg imperial family would come by like empress Maria Ludovika (1787-1816), the third wife of emperor Francis I (1768-1835), or archdukes Archduke John of Austria (1782-1859) and Ferdinand d'Este (1781-1859) when they were in Vienna. Other guests included the painter Ferdinand Runk (1764-1834), who painted watercolors for the prince. In the second half of July, the prince would move to his palace in Lednice (German: Schloss Eisgrub), where the hunting season would begin in September.

Schloss Liechtenstein was frequently visited by the princely family until the Second World War . Especially, prince Johann II liked to stay there. He considered it his most beloved palace (German: Lieblingsschloss).

=== Second World War and its aftermath ===
In 1938, facing the expansion of Nazi Germany, prince Franz Josef II of Liechtenstein (1906–1989) became the first prince to reside in the principality. A large part of the prince's archive was stored in the palace, just as a valuable collection of Biedermeier furniture and paintings. During the Second World War, the palace was requisitioned by the Wehrmacht, which used it as a hospital. In 1945, Schloss Liechtenstein suffered severe war damage.

During the Soviet occupation of eastern Austria after the Second World War, the palace was requisitioned by Russian occupying forces until 1955. Subsequently between 1955 and 1956, it was used a refugee camp for Hungarians who left Hungary after the attempted Hungarian Revolution of 1956. As a result, the palace became uninhabitable and so dilapidated that full demolition was barely averted in 1964. Only the eastern wing and the outbuildings were demolished in 1961.

The princely house of Liechtenstein sold the palace as a semi-ruin. After extensive conversion and renovation work, it was transformed into a retirement home. However, only the central part remained intact. The demolished side wings were rebuilt in their original form, but only for the exterior. The reconstruction took place from 1977 to 1989. A further renovation took place in 2005.

=== Modern times ===
Today, Schloss Liechtenstein still serves as a senior residence. Theater performances are held in the basement during the summer. Liechtenstein castle is still owned by the princely Liechtenstein family.

== Architecture ==
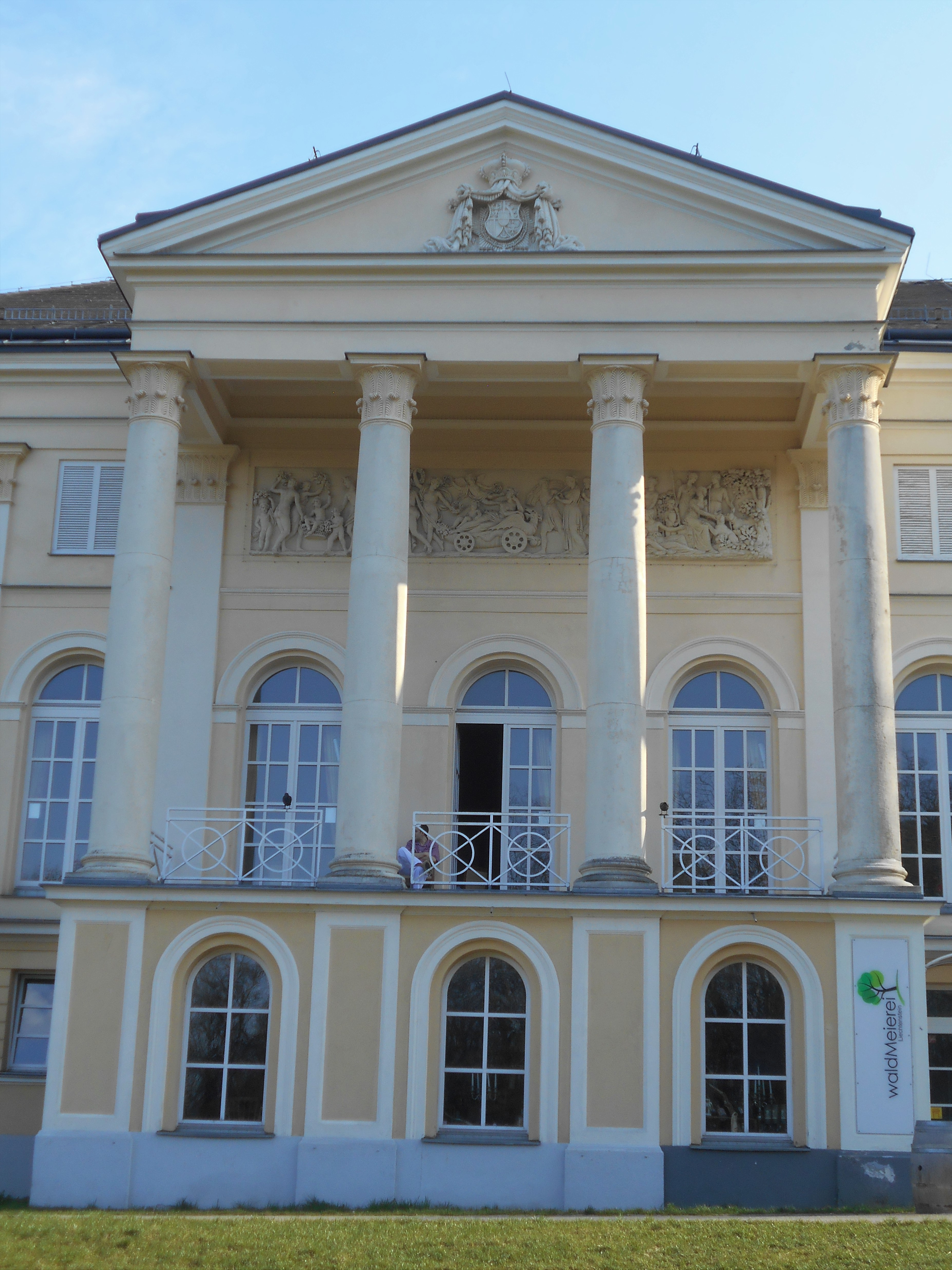
Portico of Schloss Liechtenstein

Schloss Liechtenstein lies on a meadow in the landscape park in close proximity to Liechtenstein castle. The palace is a straightforward, elongated, three-story building. The classical central section with nine axes on the facade facing the castle is particularly prominent. This section showcases tall arched windows or doors on the main floor, with vertical divisions created by giant pilasters between the upper-floor windows. In front of the three central axes, there is a gabled columned loggia. Four tall columns, reminiscent of a Greek temple, support an attic with a triangular gable, adorned with a stone Liechtenstein coat of arms. The relief Bacchantes frieze behind the portico's columns was crafted by Josef Klieber. The base floor on either side of the portico features grooved detailing.

The wall-fixed furnishings in the representative rooms on the first floor of the central section remain in their original state, despite the disappearance of the movable furnishings during the Soviet occupation. Behind the portico is the banquet hall, which spans the two upper floors. It opens onto the terrace of the loggia through three tall doors. The shallow barrel vault of the hall is adorned with classical decorative paintings in grisaille technique. The walls are structured by arched door frames and blind arches. The wall paintings in the lunettes, created by Friedrich Schilcher in 1839, depict the nine Muses.

== Garden ==
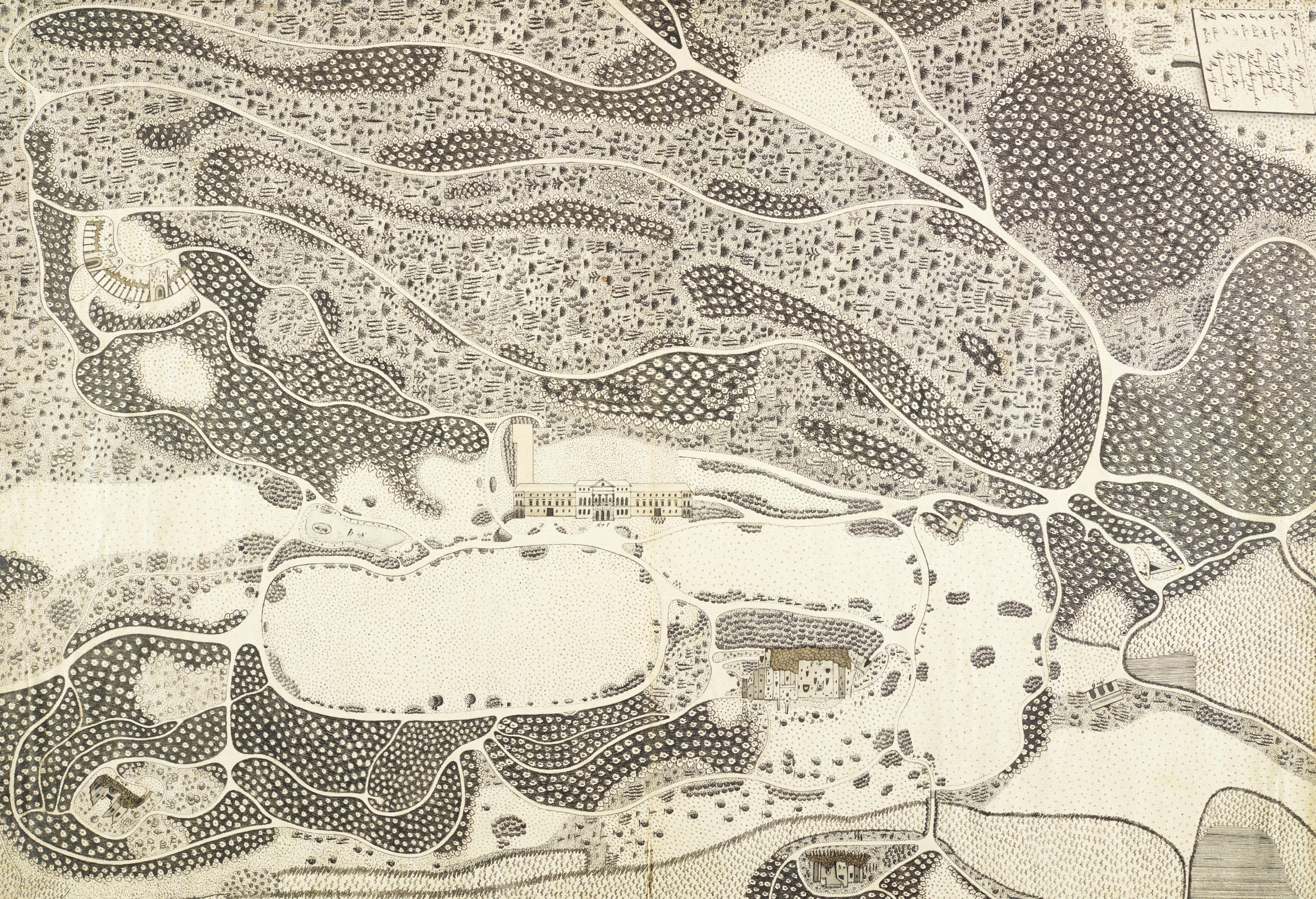
Plan of the landscape garden around Schloss Liechtenstein

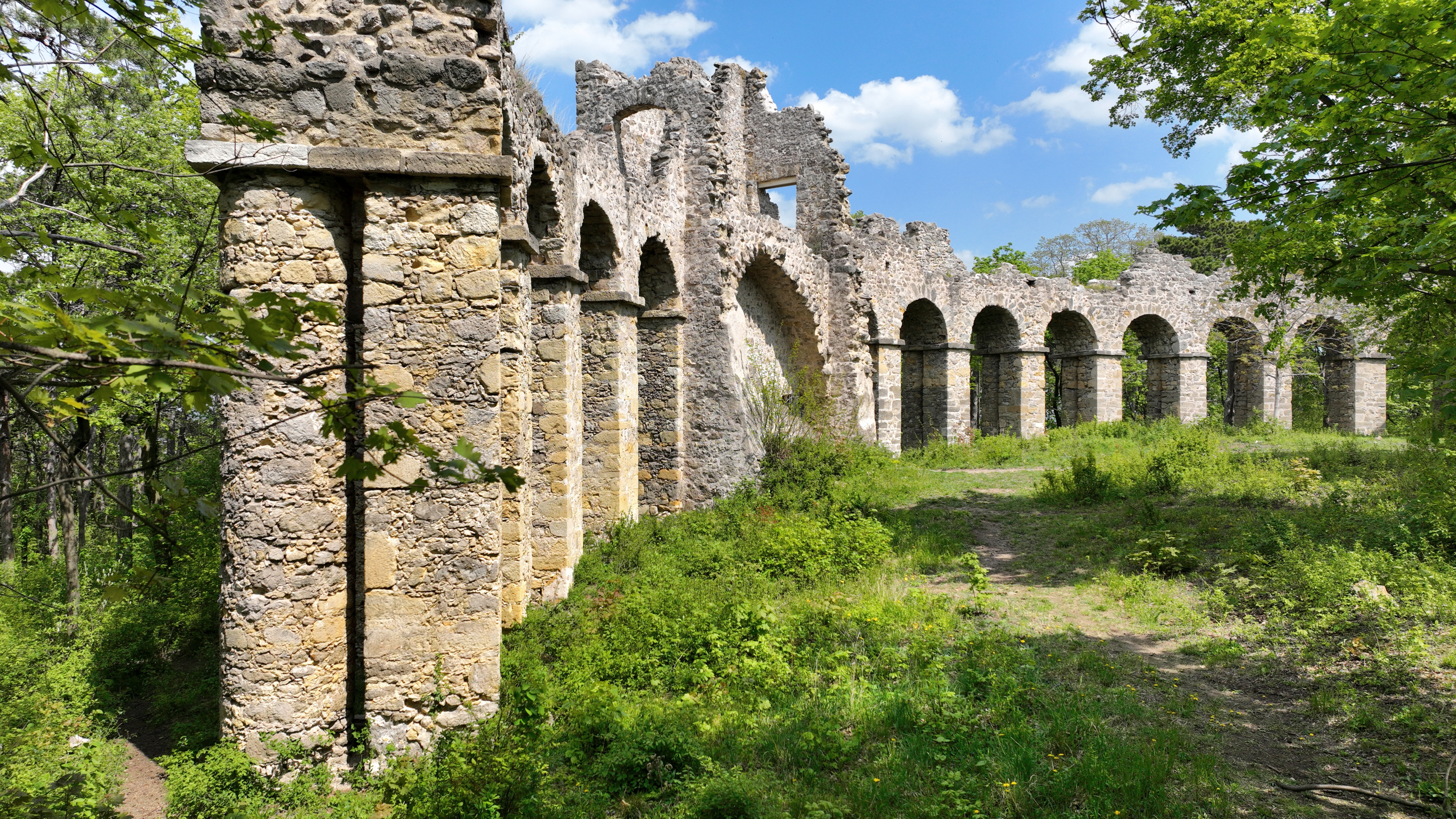
The amphitheatre in the landscape garden

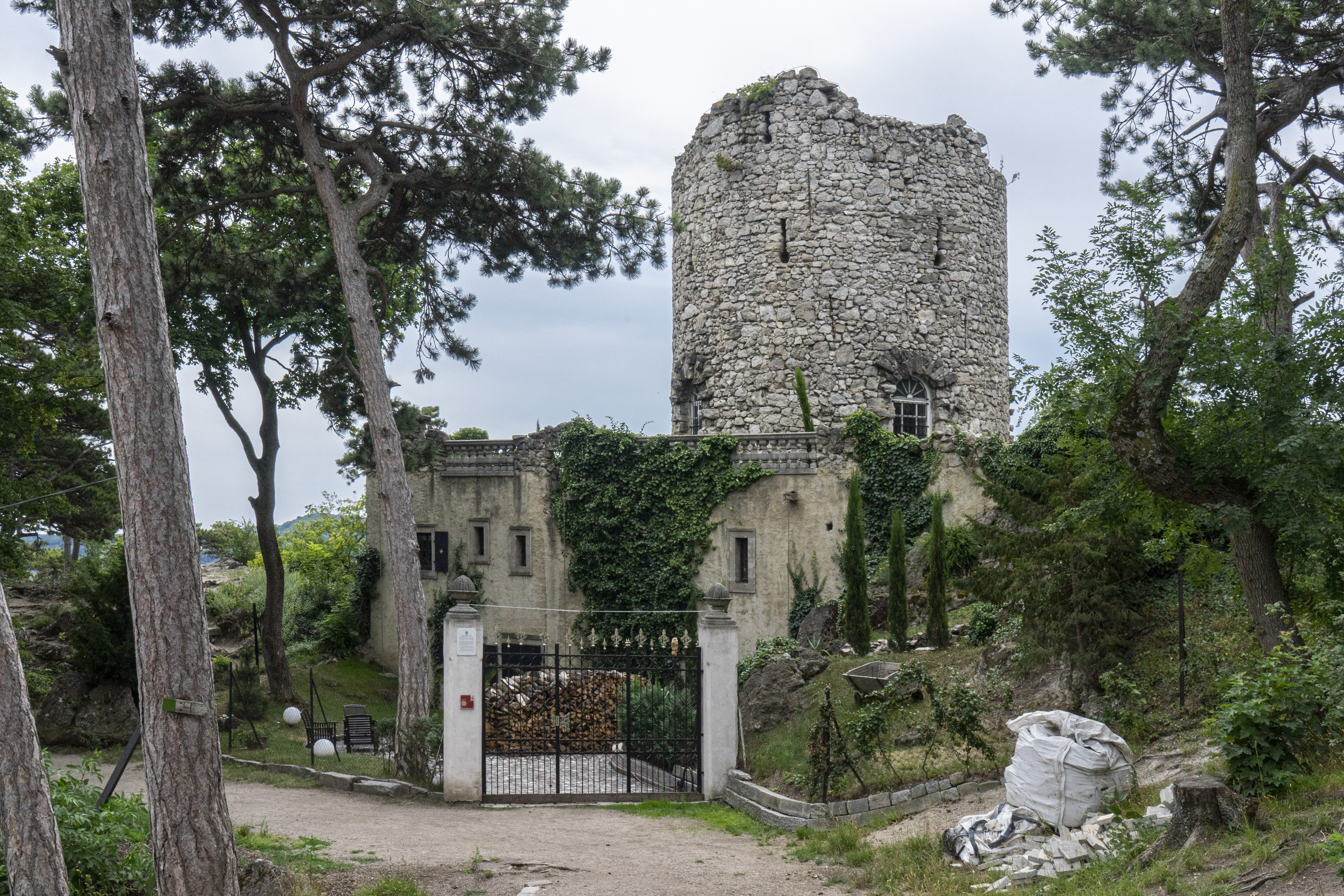
The black tower near Mödling

The first gardens around Schloss Liechtenstein were already laid out in the 18th century. Prince Poniatowski started with reforesting the Kalenderberg hill behind the palace. But it was prince Johann I who really started creating the park from the moment he acquired his ancestral estate back. He created the large English landscape garden, which measures around 200 hectares. At its centre the garden was designed as an so-called "ornamented farm". "Creating of ornamented farms" was a movement in 19th century gardening that tried to include the countryside surrounding a garden into the architectural design of the garden itself. For this purpose lanes and bridges were built and alleys and hedges planted.

Prince Johann I also constructed the roads and alleys through the landscape park so that not only he, but also that visitors could enjoy the beauty of the garden. In addition, they became aware of the size of the Liechtenstein estate.

Joseph Hardtmuth was not only involved in the restoration of Liechtenstein castle, but he also designed many of the artificial ruins and temples in the park. Prince Johann I later also involved Joseph Kornhäusel (1782-1860) in the design of the follies and other structures on the estate. Examples are the Amphitheatre, the Roman wall, the Black tower, the Hussars temple, and the alliance pyramid.

=== Amphitheatre ===
One of the artificial ruins within the landscape garden is the Amphitheatre. It was created by prince Johann I of Liechtenstein to enhance the black-pine forest he had planted in 1808. Also, it served as a viewpoint over the surrounding area. Its design is from the architect Joseph Hardtmuth.

It is a semi-circular building with 16 vaulted arches supported by massive pillars and Doric columns as well as two towers. It contains stylistic elements of the Roman Colosseum. The material used was quarry stone from the surrounding area.

== See also ==
- Lednice–Valtice Cultural Landscape
- Liechtenstein Castle (Maria Enzersdorf)
- Stadtpalais Liechtenstein and Liechtenstein Garden Palace in Vienna, Austria
- Vaduz Castle in Liechtenstein – the official residence of the Princely Family of Liechtenstein
- Wilfersdorf Castle

== Literature ==
- Donin, Richard (1953). Dehio Handbuch - Die Kunstdenkmäler Österreichs, Niederösterreich (in German). Wien. p. 187.
- Schwarz, Mario (1982). Architektur des Klassizismus und der Romantik in Niederösterreich. Wissenschaftliche Schriftenreihe Niederösterreich 62/63 (in German). Vienna: Verlag Niederösterreiches Pressehaus. ISBN 3853265472.
- Büttner, Rudolf; Faßbinder, Brigitte (1988). Burgen und Schlösser in Niederösterreich: Zwischen Mödling, Purkersdorf und Klosterneuburg (in German). Wien: Birken Verlag. ISBN 9783850300148.
- Clam Martinic, Georg (1991). Burgen & Schlösser in Österreich von Voralberg bis Burgenland (in German). Linz: Landesverlag in Veritas Verlag. p. 153. ISBN 9783850016797.
- Achleitner, Michaela (2003). Der Landschaftspark Liechtenstein in Maria Enzersdorf bei Mödling. Geschichte, Bestand und Maßnahmenvorschläge (Thesis) (in German). Vienna: Die Universität für Bodenkultur Wien.
- Kräftner, Johann (2005). Biedermeier im Haus Liechtenstein. Die Epoche im Licht der Fürstlichen Sammlungen. Liechtenstein Museum Wien (in German). München: Prestel Verlag. ISBN 9783791334967.
- Kräftner, Johann (2008). Oasen der Stille: Die großen Landschaftsgärten Mitteleuropas: Die großen Landschaftsgärten in Mitteleuropa. Katalog zur Ausstellung im Liechtenstein Museum, Wien (in German). Wien: Brandstätter Verlag. ISBN 978-3850332316.
- Jurik, Pavel (2009). Moravska Dominia Liechtensteinu a Dietrichsteinu (in Czech). Praha: Nakladatelstvi Libri. pp. 303–305. ISBN 978-80-7277-403-6.
- Gröninger, Ralf; Hlavac, Christian (2 June 2015). "Die Landschaftsgestaltung von Johann I. von Liechtenstein im Bezirk Mödling". Heimatkundliche Beilage zum Amtsblatt der Bezirkshauptmannschaft Mödling (in German). 50. Mödling: 9–15.
- Kräftner, Johann (2016). Klassizismus und Biedermeier in Mitteleuropa Band 1 - Architektur und Innenraumgestaltuing in Österreich und seinen Kronländern 1780-1850 (in German). Wien: Brandstätter Verlag. pp. 301–388. ISBN 978-3850338219.
- Kuthan, Jiri (2020). "Die Bautätigkeit der Liechtensteiner". Adelssitze in den Böhmischen Ländern 1780-1914 (in German). Prag: Karlsuniversität. pp. 75–112. ISBN 978-80-7422-751-6.

== Panorama ==
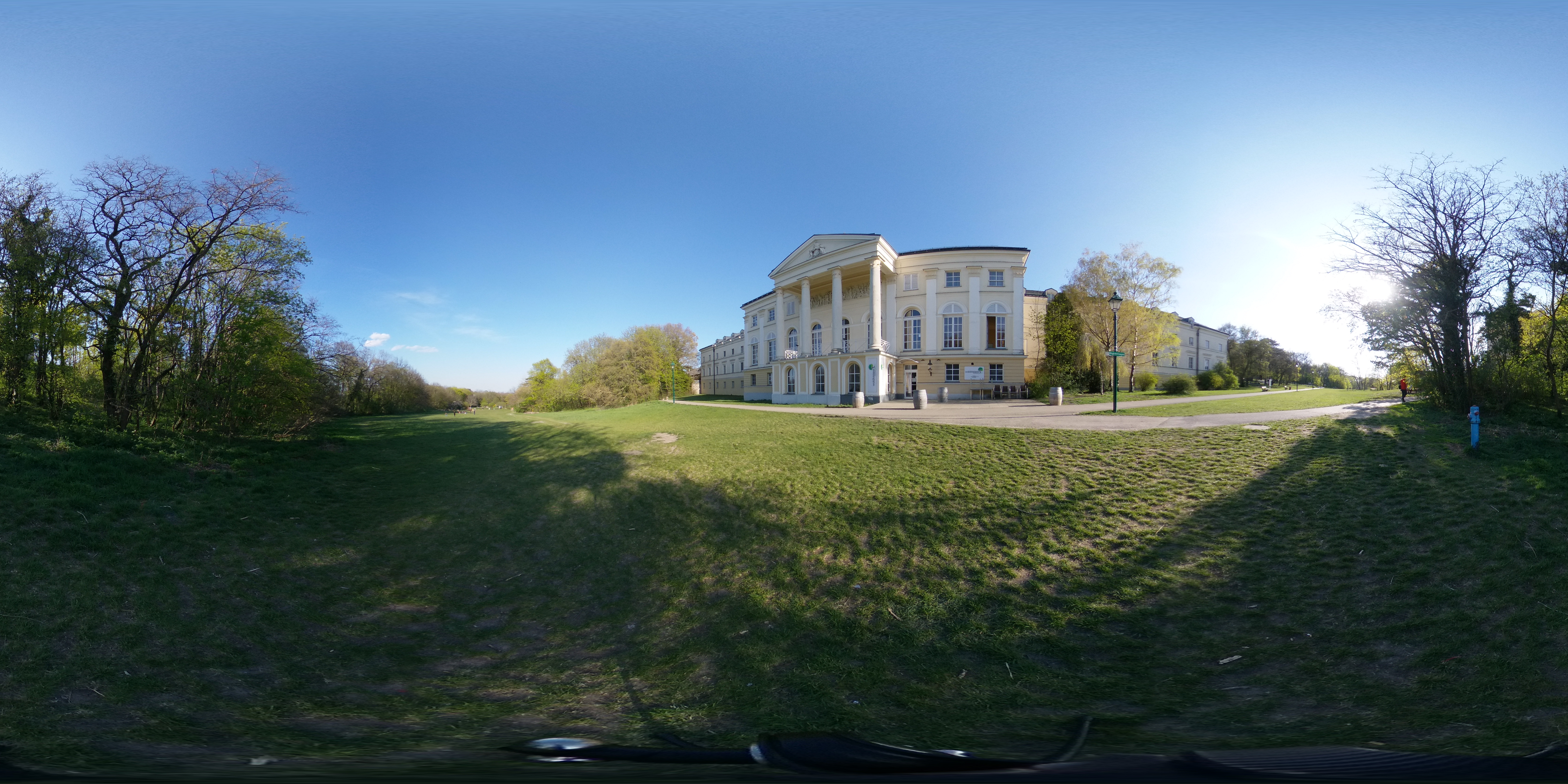
Schloss Liechtenstein
