= Joseph Kornhäusel =

Austrian architect

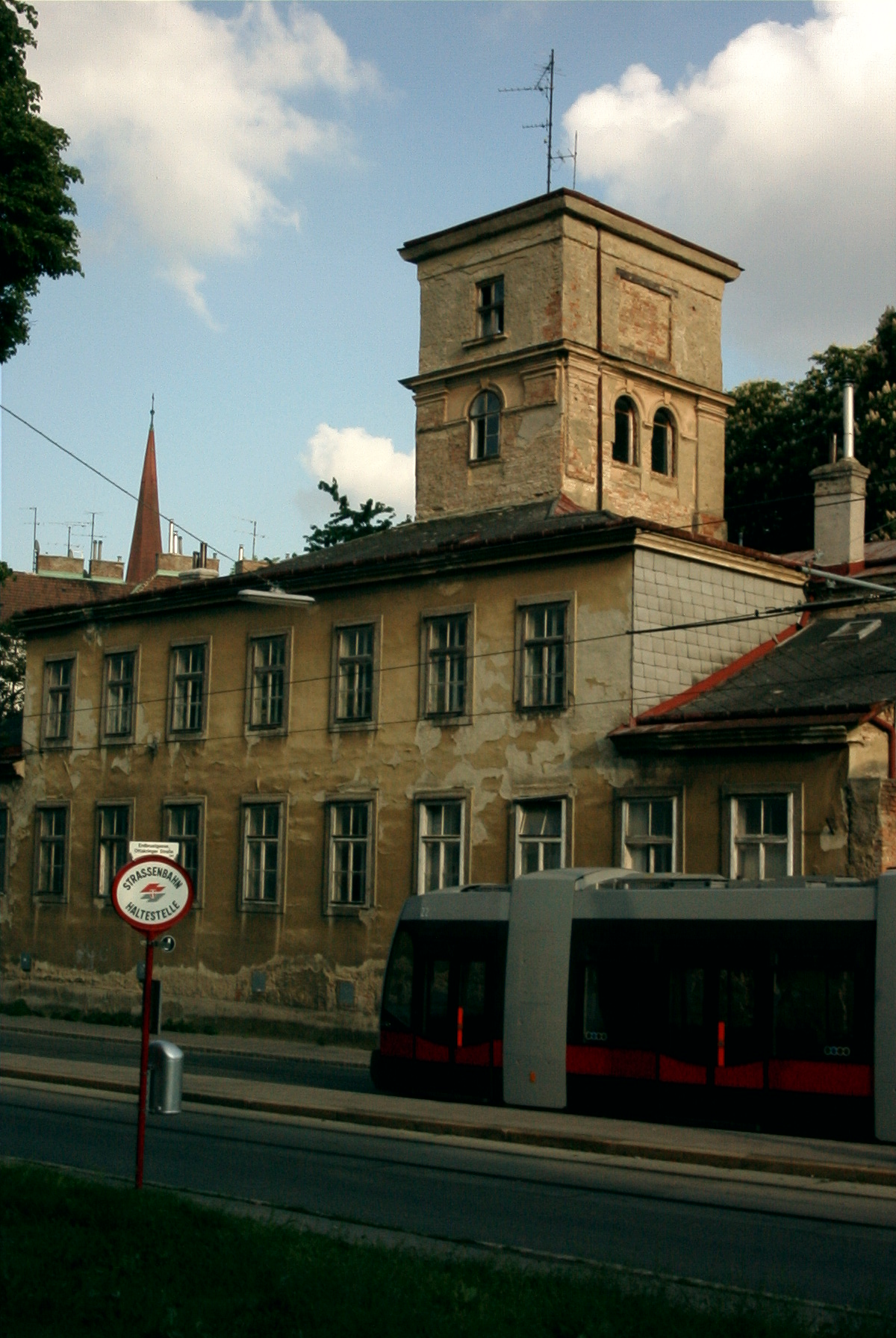
Landhaus Jenamy in Ottakring

Josef Georg Kornhäusel (13 November 1782, in Vienna - 31 October 1860, in Vienna) was an Austrian architect of the first half of the 19th century. He primarily employed the contemporary style of Neoclassical architecture, moving to the Biedermeier style in his later oevre.

Kornhäusel was court architect to Johann I Joseph, Prince of Liechtenstein, for whom he had built palaces, theaters and garden pavilions.

== Major works ==
- Domestic architecture: Numerous apartment buildings and villas in Vienna and Baden
- Weilburg Palace in Baden, 1820-1824
- Theater in der Josefstadt, 1822
- Interior of the museum Albertina, 1822
- Stadttempel, the main synagogue of the Jewish community in Vienna, 1824-1826
- Extension to the Schottenstift, 1826-1832
- Extension of the château in Hnojník
- Habsburg Palace in Cieszyn, 1838-1840
