= Weilburg Palace =

Former Habsburg palace in Baden, Austria

Coordinates: 48°0′24.1″N 16°12′32.0″E

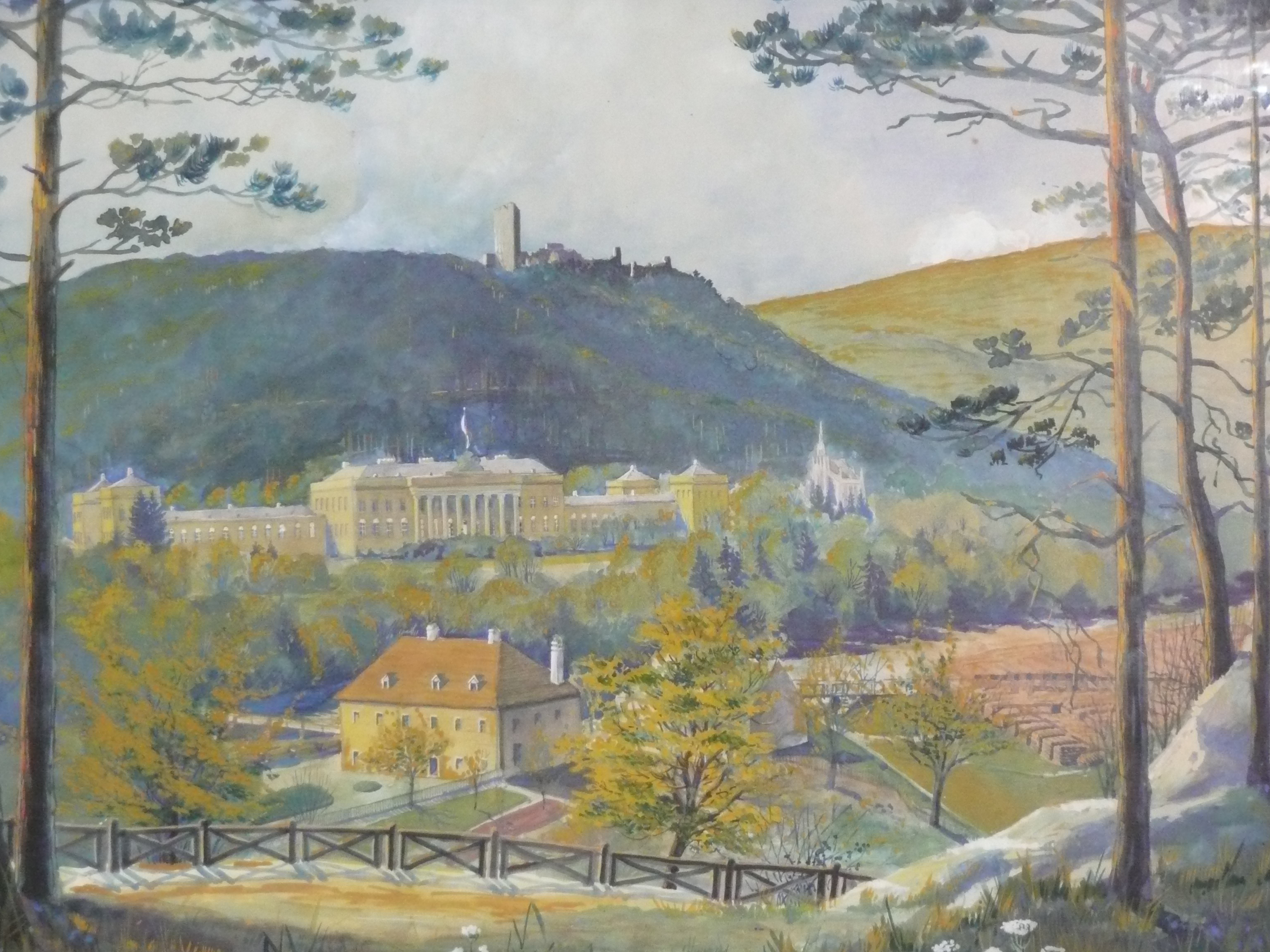
Weilburg palace dreaming in the valley, while the ruins of Rauheneck castle look down from the hill

The Weilburg palace (German: Schloss Weilburg) is a former neoclassical palace in Baden near Vienna, Austria. Constructed in 1820, it was a present from archduke Charles, duke of Teschen (1771–1847) to his beloved wife, princess Henrietta of Nassau-Weilburg (1797–1829). The neoclassical design was by the architect Joseph Kornhäusel (1782–1860). It became the seat of the Teschen branch of the Habsburg family. A fire broke out in April 1945, probably lit by retreating soldiers of the Wehrmacht and as the Red Army prohibited the fire to be extinguished, the palace was destroyed. Due to misunderstanding and ignorance, the ruins were blown up in the 1960s.

Today, nothing is left from this beautiful palace except the coat of arms, which once decorated the palace. The palace was once considered the most significant example of Biedermeier style in Austria.

== History ==
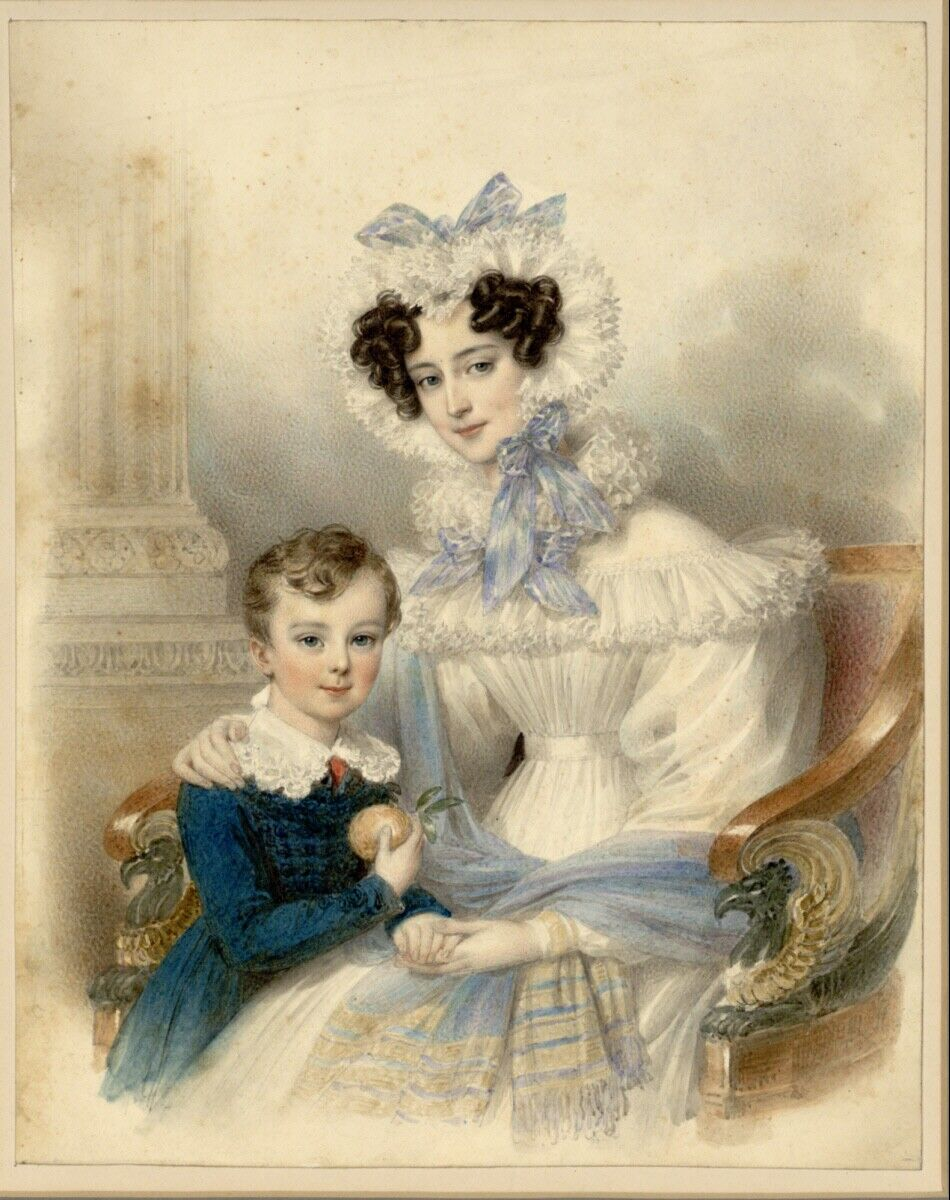
Princess Henrietta with archduke Albrecht in the 1820s

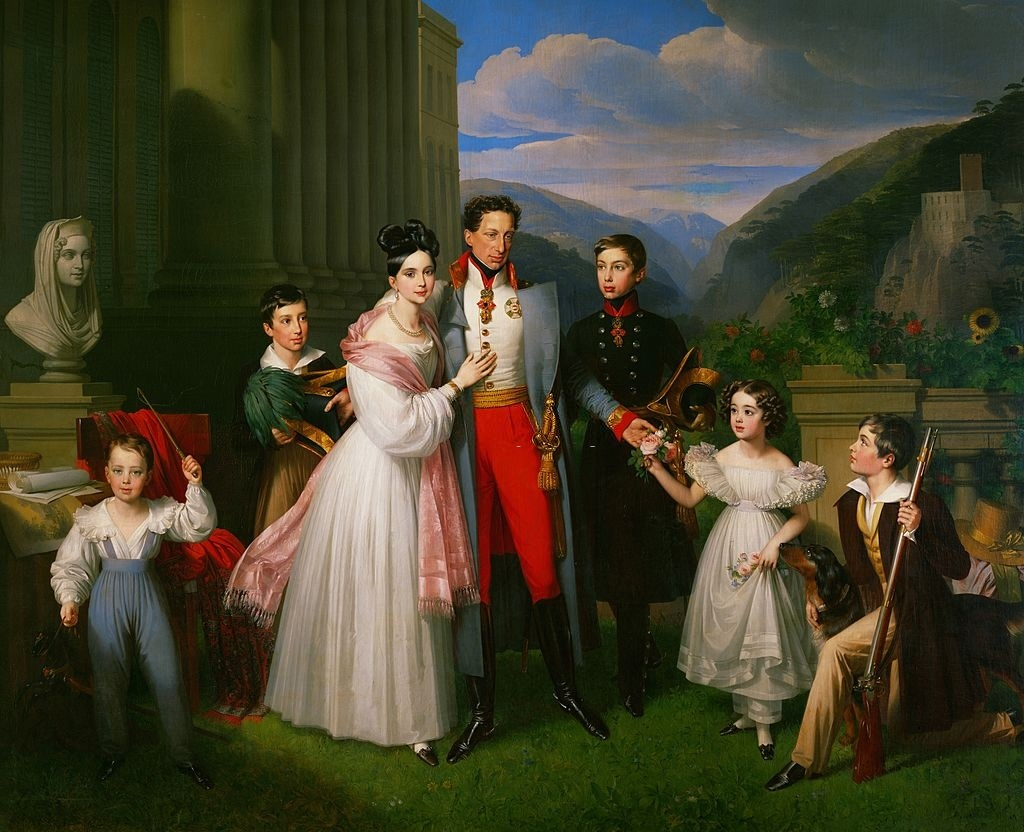
Archduke Charles with his family in front of the Weilburg palace

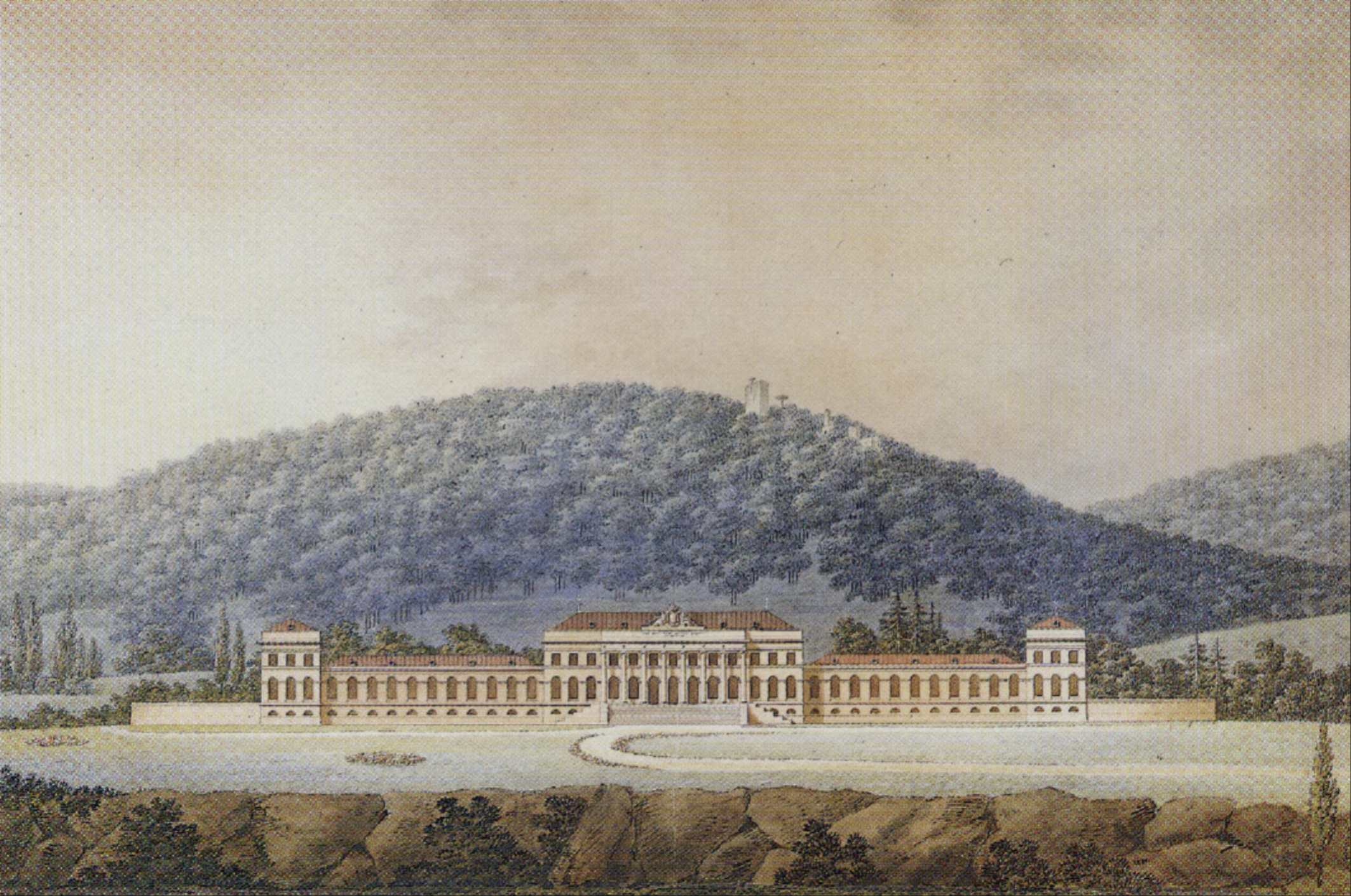
Weilburg palace seen from the north in 1820. The palace front had a length of 201 meters

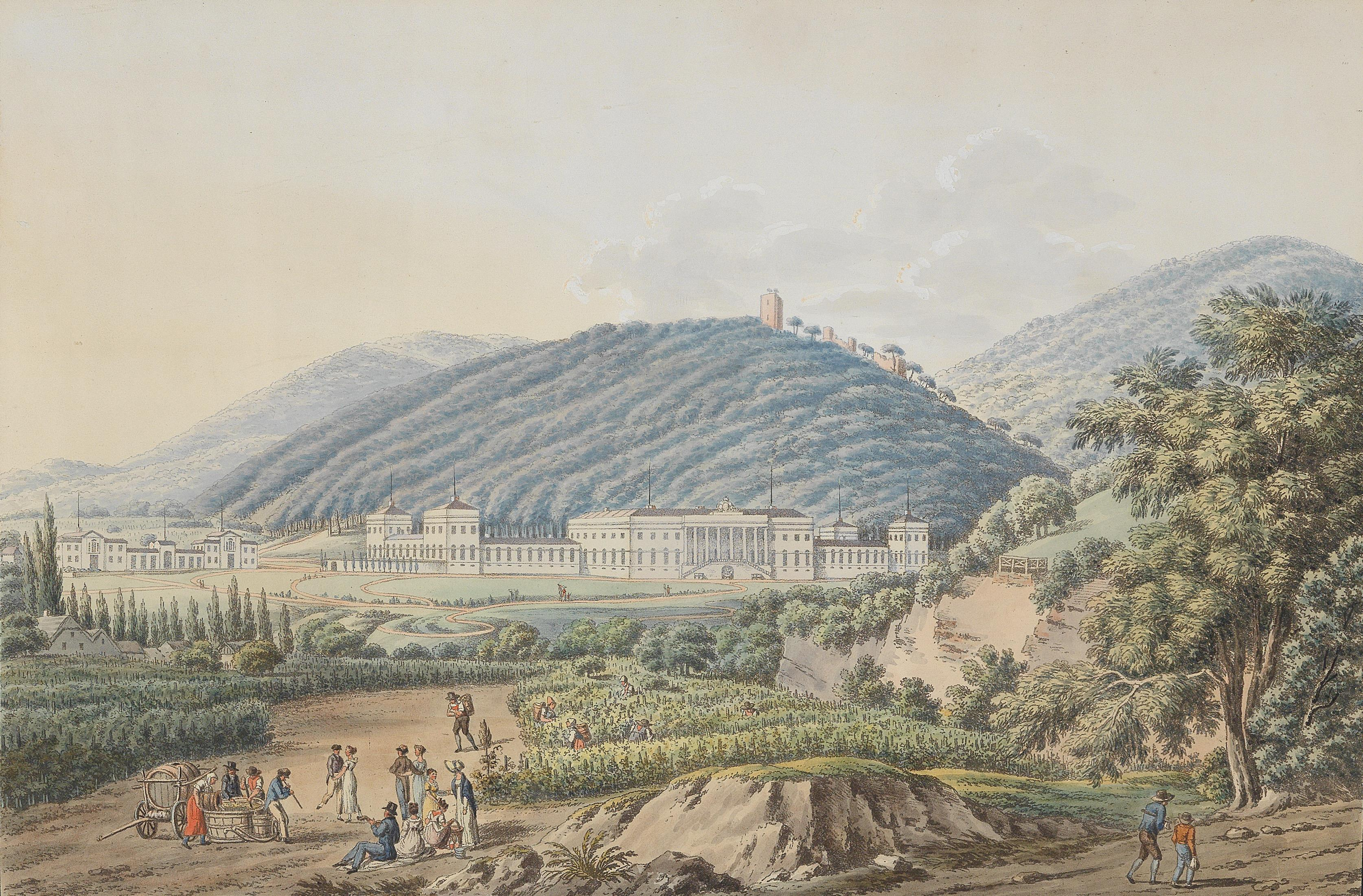
Weilburg palace around 1825

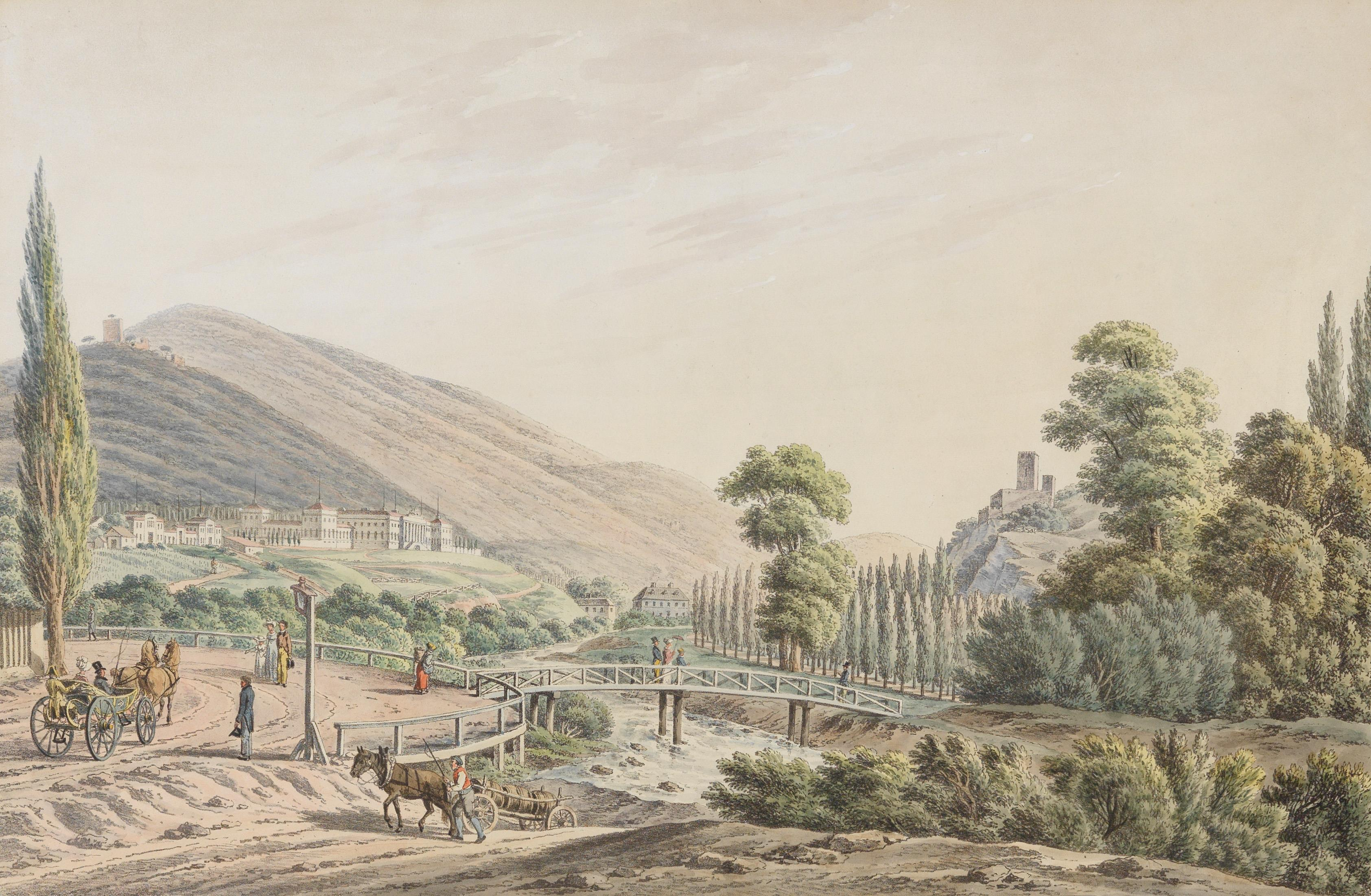
Weilburg palace at the entrance of the Helenental valley around 1825

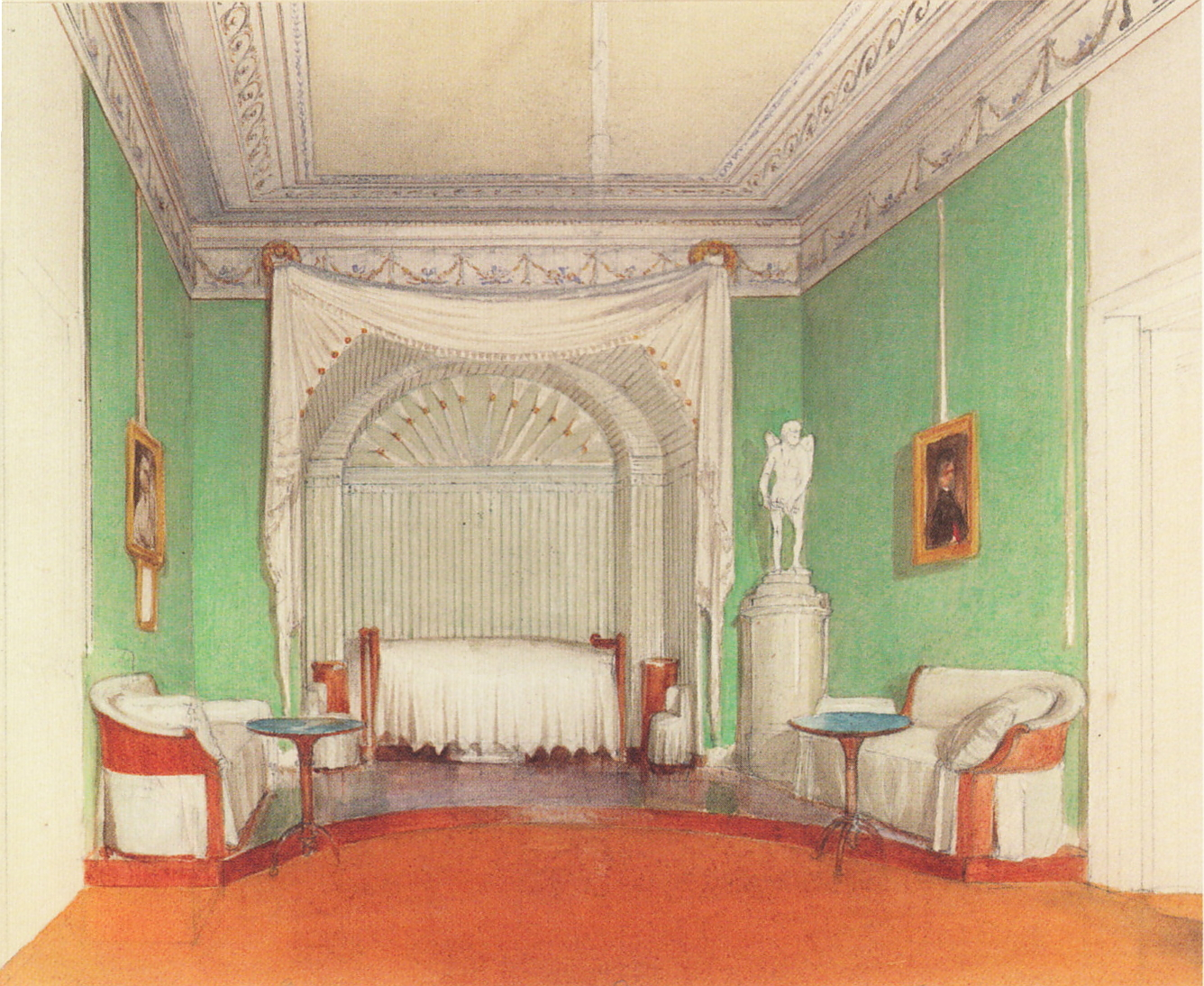
Archduke Charles's bedroom

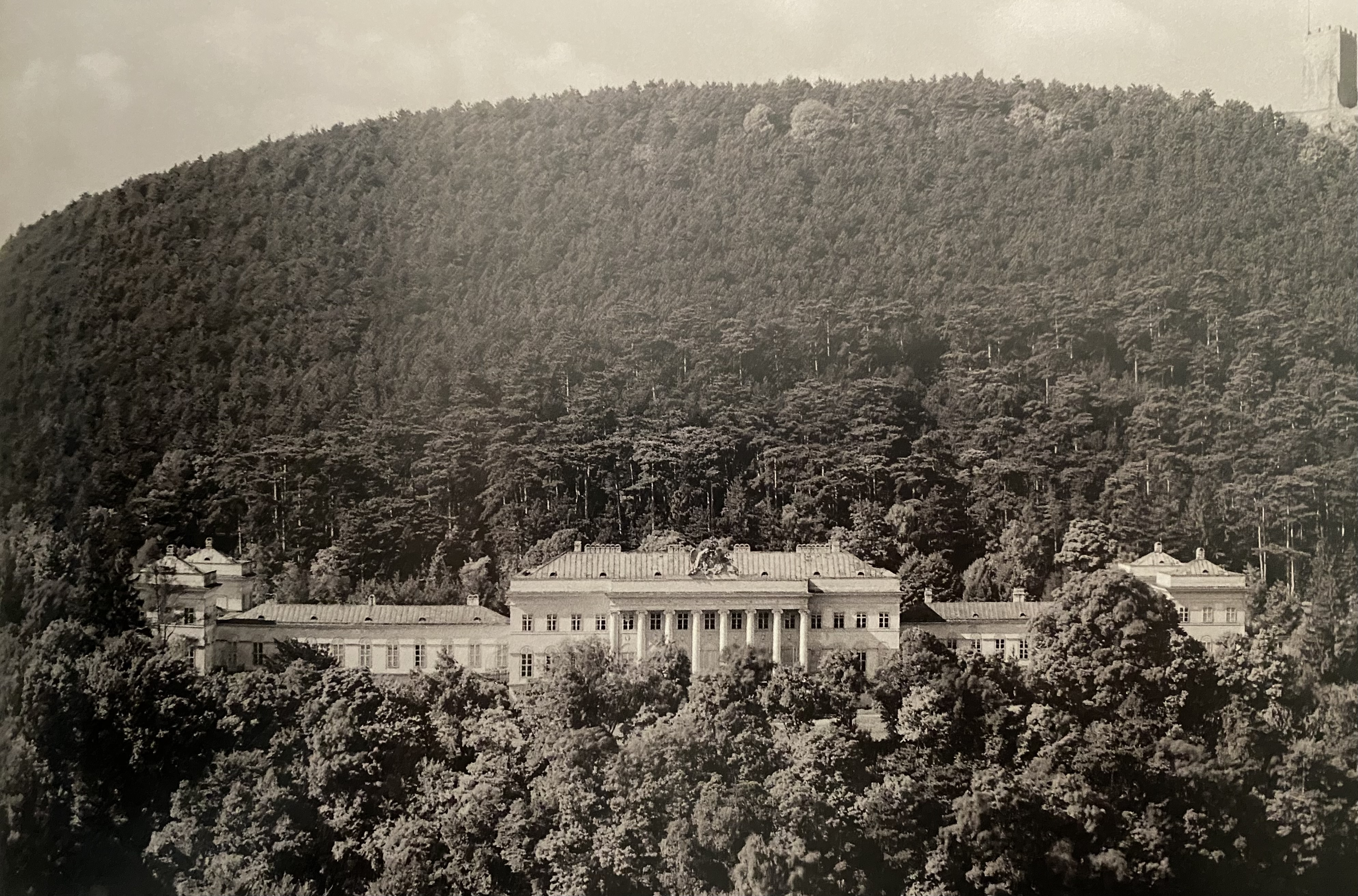
Weilburg palace around 1900

=== Archduke Charles of Teschen and princess Henrietta of Nassau-Weilburg: a palace as a gift of love ===
Archduke Charles was the third son of Emperor Leopold II and his wife, Maria Luisa of Spain. He was also the younger brother of Francis II, Holy Roman Emperor. However, he had been adopted and raised by his childless aunt Marie Christine of Austria and her husband Albert of Saxe-Teschen. He was the heir to the Duchy of Teschen and would succeed in 1822.

The archduke was epileptic, but achieved respect both as a commander and as a reformer of the Austrian army. He was considered one of Napoleon's more formidable opponents and one of the greatest generals of the French Revolutionary and Napoleonic Wars. He was the victor of the Battle of Aspern-Essling against Napoleon.

On 15 September/17 September 1815 in Weilburg, archduke Charles married princess Henrietta of Nassau-Weilburg. The bride was almost eighteen years old and the groom forty-four. But the marriage proved to be a happy one. Henriette has been known as the person who popularized the Christmas tree in Vienna after it was already introduced by Fanny von Arnstein in 1814 during the Vienna Congress.

Shortly, after the marriage he decided to construct a summer residence as a present for his wife. The location for the palace was in Baden near Vienna, a spa town favoured by the Viennese elite and members of the imperial family, who constructed extensive villas nearby. The chosen plot was at the entrance of the Helenental valley, at the foot of a hill dominated by the ruins of Rauheneck castle and opposite the ruins of Rauhenstein castle. The land was owned by the Doblhoff family, who sold it to the archduke.

The architect Joseph Kornhäusel made the neoclassical design, who also rebuilt large parts of Baden in a Biedermeier style after a fire destroyed large parts of the town in 1812. The laying of the foundation stone took place on 13 September 1820, after which construction started. On 24 December 1821, archduke Charles presented the palace to his wife Henriette. The palace could be moved into on 4 June 1823. The building was named after Henriette's hometown Weilburg.

With a front length of 201 meters, the Weilburg palace was one of the most significant neoclassical buildings in Austria. Moritz Gottlieb Saphir (1795–1858), a contemporary, called it "a stone poem, an epic built by a hero," alluding to the builder's military glory.

On the north side of the house, a coat of arms designed in stone by Josef Klieber (1773–1850) was placed on the attic of the seven-axial portico, combining the lion of the House of Nassau with the heraldic animals of the House of Habsburg-Lorraine, the eagle and the lion.

On the night of 29 to 30 December 1829, Henriette of Nassau-Weilburg died in Vienna. In her will, she bequeathed the Weilburg palace to her eldest son Albrecht, who was still a minor. The management of the property was entrusted to his father, Archduke Karl, who died on 30 April 1847.

=== Archduke Albrecht of Teschen ===
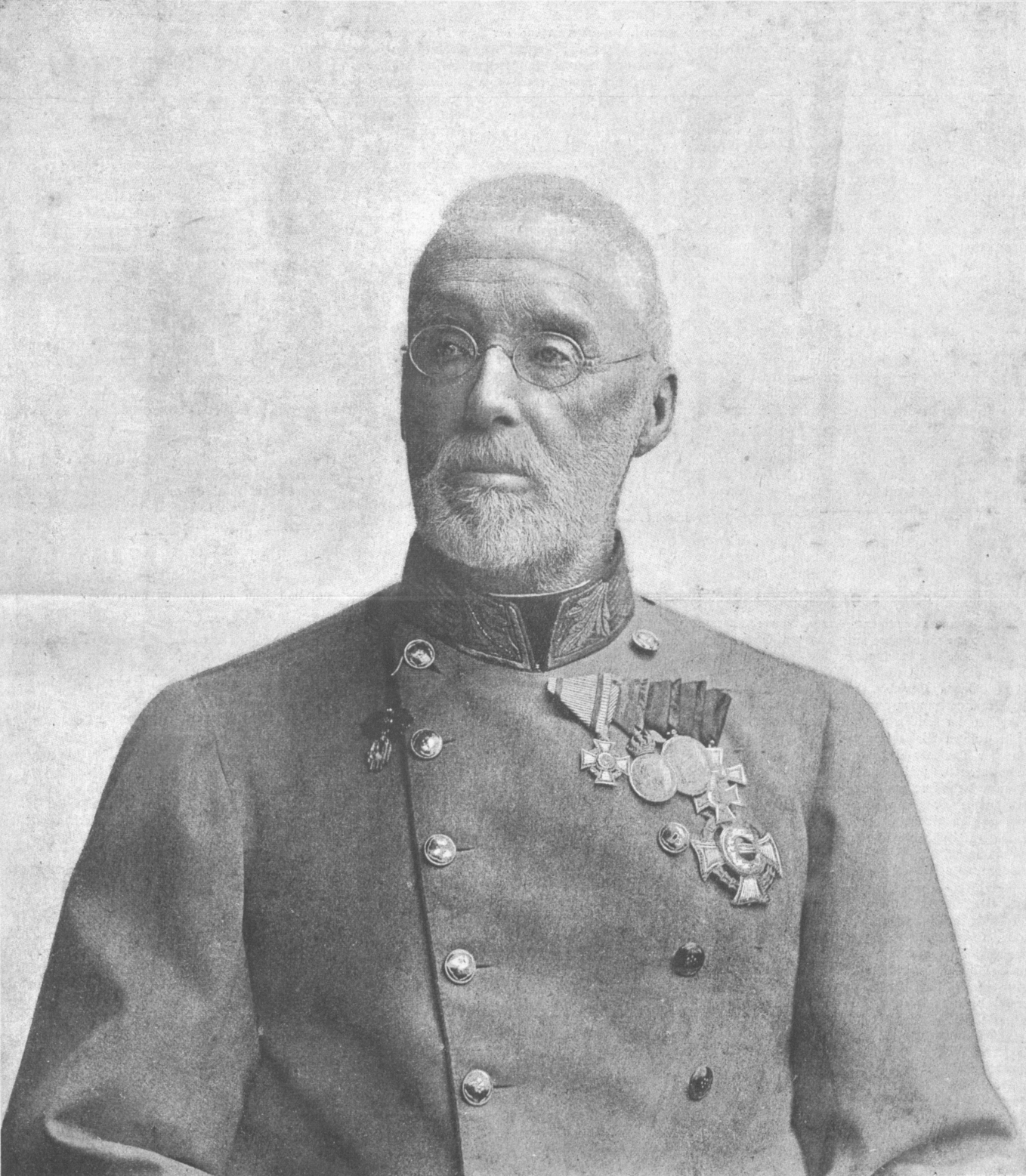
Archduke Albrecht around 1895

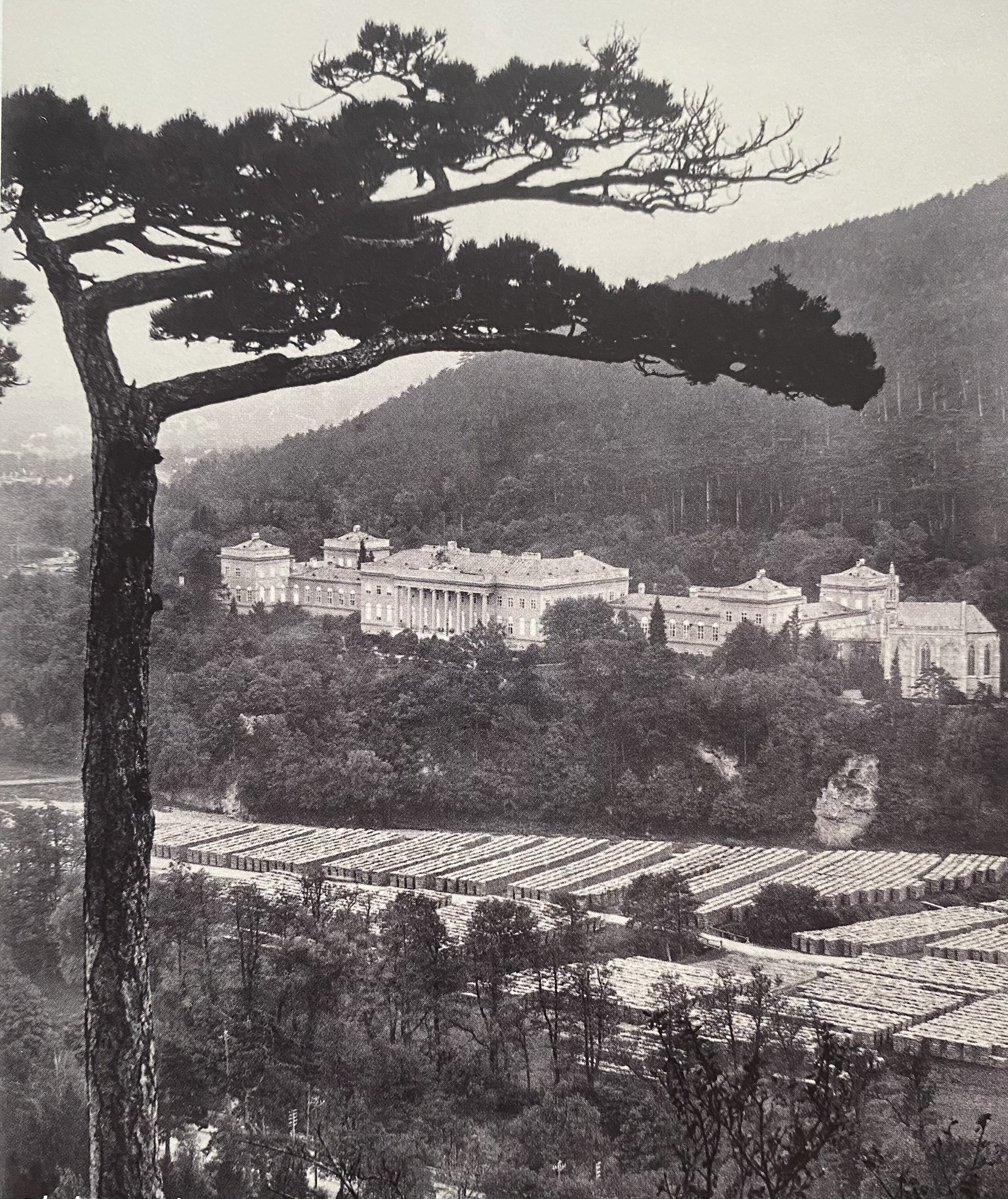
Weilburg palace seen from the ruins of Rauhenstein castle

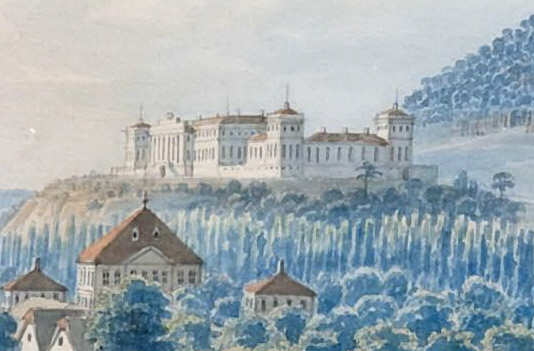
Weilburg palace - Detail from a landscape by Johann Raulino

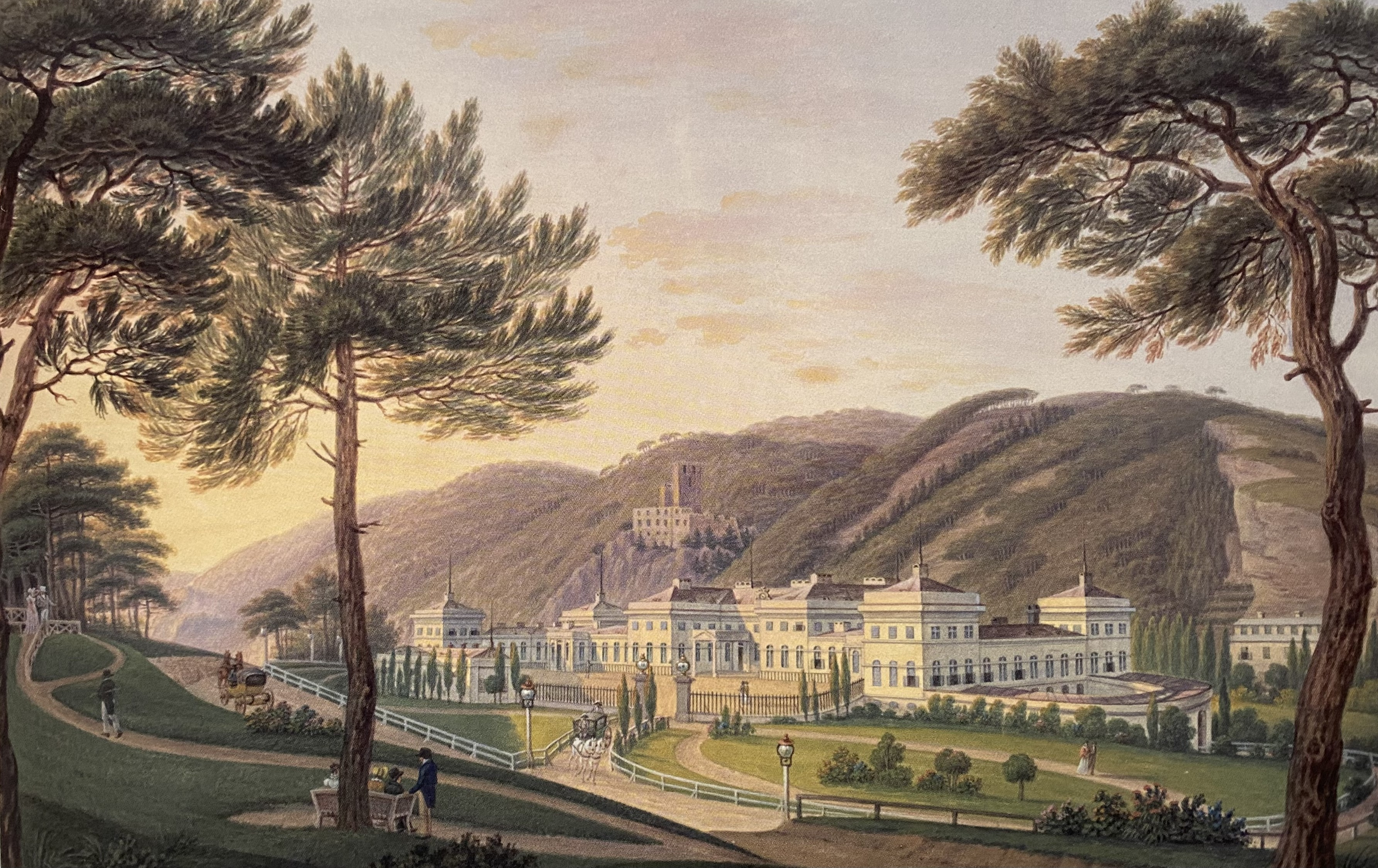
Weilburg palace by Franz Jaschke in 1823. The ruins of Rauhenstein castle in the back

Archduke Albrecht (1817–1895) spent almost every summer in Baden and expanded the Weilburg estate by purchasing the forest area on Rauheneck Mountain from the Doblhoff lordship. His wife, princess Hildegard of Bavaria (1825–1864), had a lookout pavilion built there, named "Hildegardruhe."

In July 1840, the street leading to the palace was described as being illuminated to such an extent during summer nights that "the area resembles the Vienna glacis", the old walls around the city.

Schloss Weilburg's beautiful location often made it a subject for painters such as Jakob Alt, Thomas Ender, Balthasar Wigand, or Eduard Gurk.

In 1856, archduke Albrecht built a Neo-gothic chapel near the western wing of the palace. It was designed by the architect Anton Heft. The chapel was consecrated on 31 July 1858.

Archduke Albrecht was honoured as a respected military leader with an equestrian monument in front of his Vienna palace, the Albertina. He died on 18 February 1895, leaving no male descendants. In his will, he appointed his nephew archduke Frederick (1856–1936), the eldest son of his brother Karl Ferdinand (1818–1874), as his heir.

=== Archduke Frederick of Teschen ===
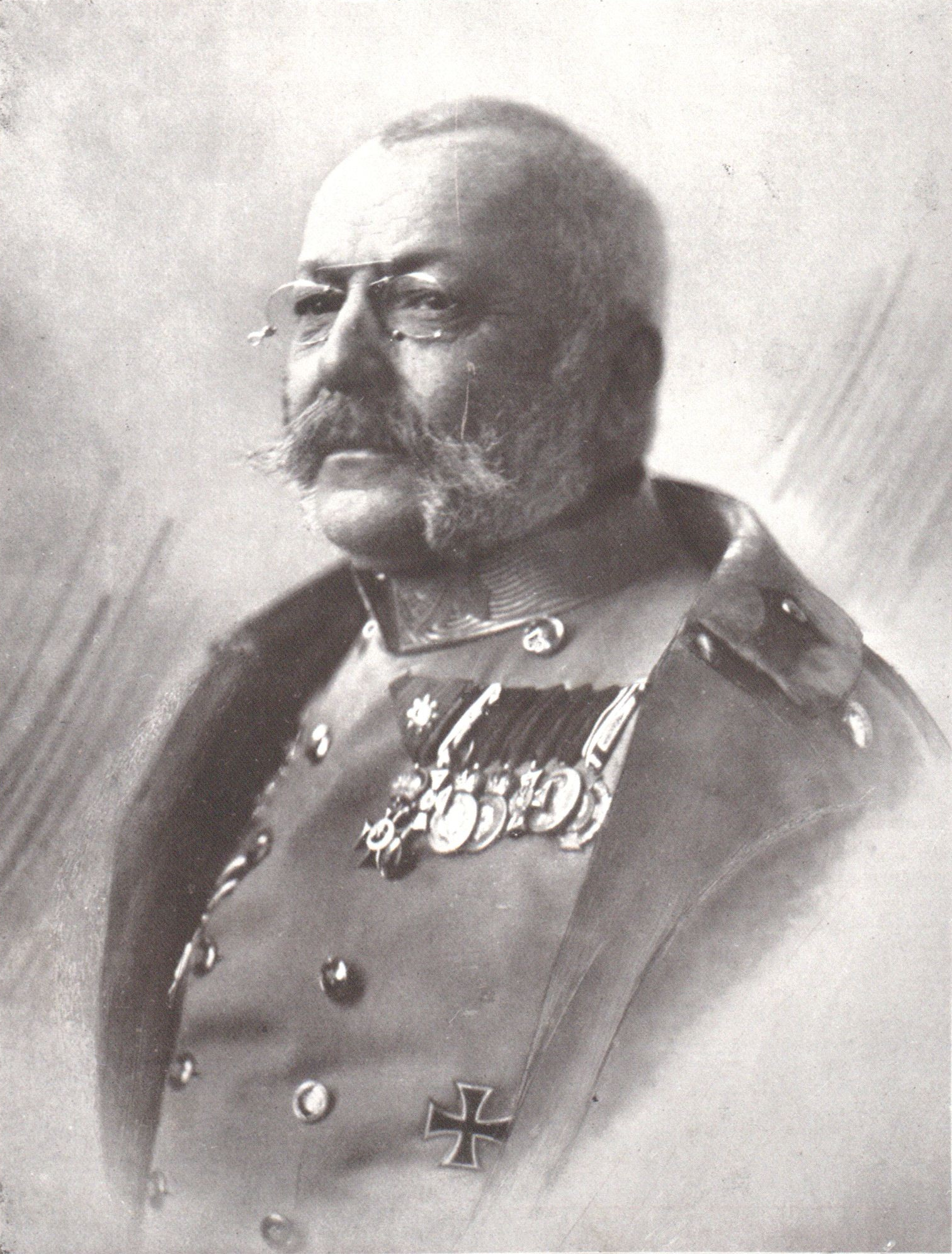
Archduke Frederick in 1916

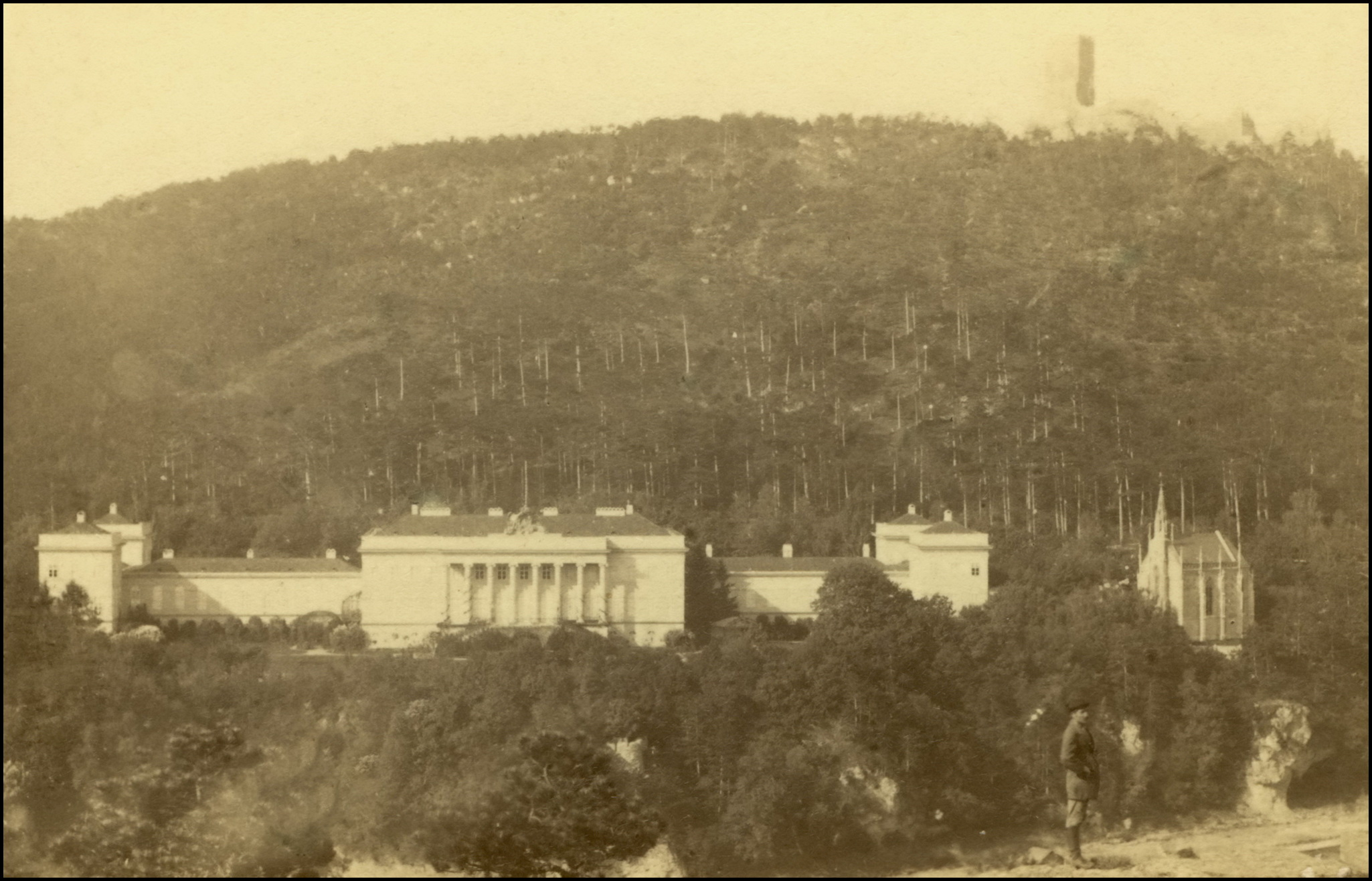
Weilburg palace in 1888

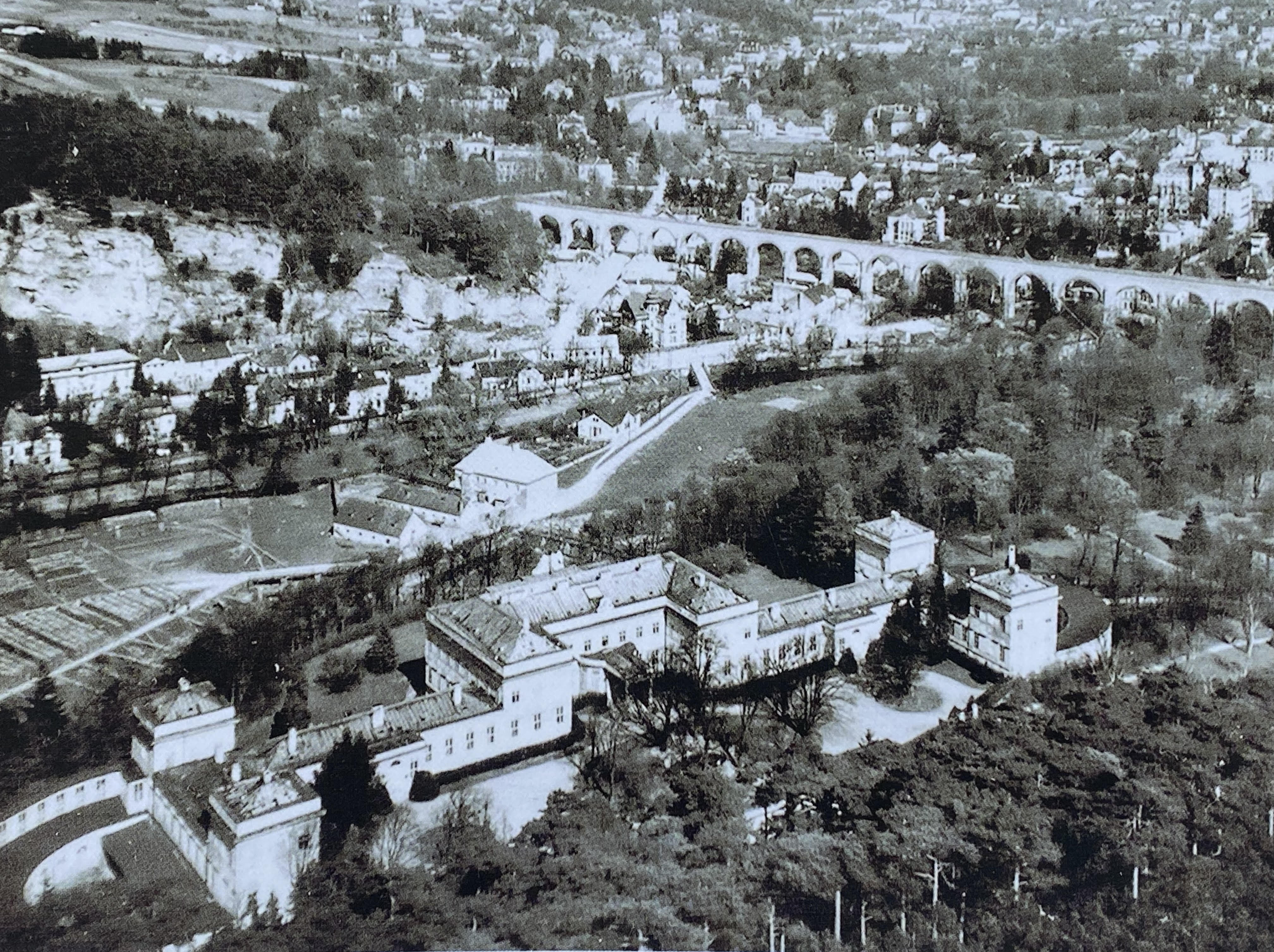
Weilburg palace seen from the ruins of Rauheneck castle in 1935

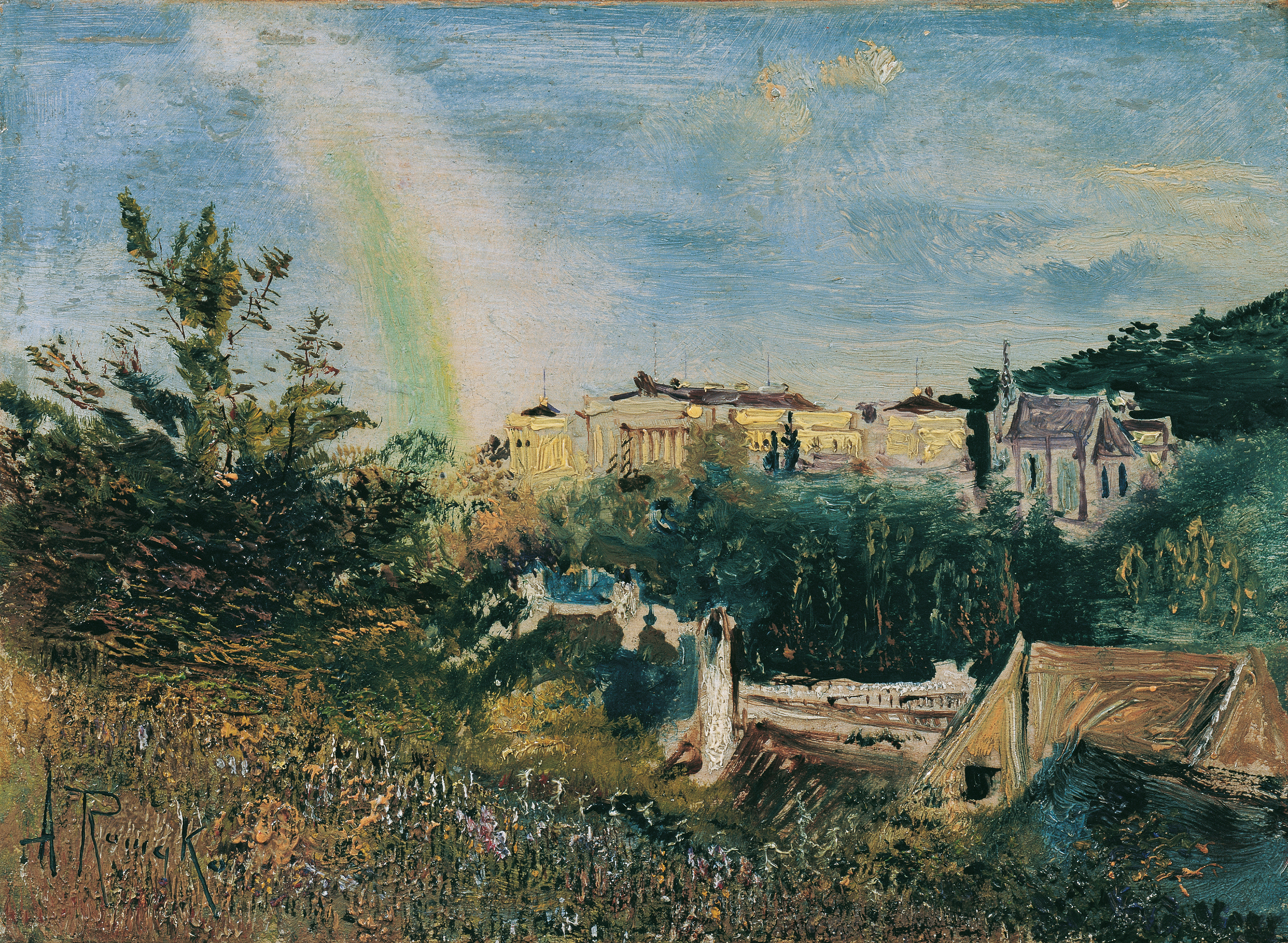
Weilburg palace seen by Anton Romako in 1885

Due to the inheritance of his uncle, archduke Frederick belonged to the wealthiest men in Austria-Hungary. Next to the Weilburg palace and the Albertina with its large art collections, he owned estates in Ungarisch-Altenburg (now Mosonmagyaróvár in Hungary), Bilje estate, Saybusch (now Żywiec in Poland), Seelowitz (now Židlochovice) and Frýdek in the Czech Republic, and the Grassalkovich Palace in Pressburg (now Bratislava in Slovakia). He was married to princess Isabella of Croÿ (1856–1931). Together, they had nine children.

Like most Habsburg princes, archduke Frederick adopted a military career, and served creditably for many years. At the start of the First World War, he was appointed by Emperor Franz Joseph I (1830–1916) as the supreme commander of the Austro-Hungarian Army. The archduke thought it his duty to accept this heavy responsibility, but, modestly underestimating his own powers, left the actual exercise of the command to his chief of staff, Franz Conrad von Hötzendorf. In the performance of ceremonial duties, and as mediator for the settlement of the conflicting demands of the military, civil and allied elements, his services were undeniable. He was promoted to the rank of Generalfeldmarschall on 8 December 1914. In February 1917, emperor Charles I (1887–1922) himself took over the supreme command. The archduke, although the Emperor's representative, no longer appeared in the foreground, and devoted himself to the management of his estates.

After World War I, Austria declared itself a republic on 12 November 1918. On 10 April 1919, the Habsburg Law came into force, which dethroned the House of Habsburg-Lorraine as rulers of Austria. The Habsburg family members had to declare themselves loyal citizens of the republic, or leave the country, otherwise their property would be confiscated. Archduke Frederick was not willing to do this. On 14 April 1919, he and his family left the Weilburg palace to move to Switzerland initially. Most of his properties in Austria and all in Czechoslovakia were confiscated, including the palaces in Bratislava and Vienna, including his art collection. However, he retained his properties in Hungary, where Miklós Horthy restored the monarchy without having a king. Also, the Weilburg palace remained his property.

In the end, archduke Frederick moved to Ungarisch-Altenburg (now Mosonmagyaróvár). A significant portion of the Weilburg's inventory was brought there. He was not allowed to re-enter the Republic of Austria since he did not make the declaration required by the Habsburg Law. The Weilburg palace remained empty in the following years.

In 1928, the social-democratic Vienna city administration expressed interest in acquiring the Weilburg as a "home for accommodating sick children," but this plan was rejected by archduke Frederick, still the owner. In 1930, the rooms were used for the exhibition "450 Years of the City of Baden", and the city council negotiated the purchase of land to expand the beach. In 1934, the idea emerged to establish the planned Baden casino in the Weilburg. The idea was abandoned because the palace was too far outside the city.

=== Archduke Albrecht Franz of Teschen ===
Archduke Frederick died on 30 December 1936. He appointed his son archduke Albrecht Franz (1897–1955) as his heir, who received his estates in Hungary and the Weilburg palace. During the Second World War, archduke Albrecht lived in Budapest. When the Red Army advanced, he fled to Argentina, where he died in Buenos Aires on 23 July 1955.

=== Second World War ===
On 31 January 1940, the Weilburg palace was placed under monument protection. On 1 April 1940, the Brandenburg Training Regiment was quartered there, followed by a mountain infantry unit. On 12 December 1944, the Wehrmacht evacuated the Weilburg palace, and on 2 April 1945, a fire broke out, destroying large parts of the palace and all of its furnishing. The fire was probably lit by retreating Wehrmacht soldiers. The advancing Red Army forbade the firefighters from extinguishing it. Rumors suggested that valuable war equipment and important documents were stored in the building, which could have been the cause of arson.

=== Post war period ===
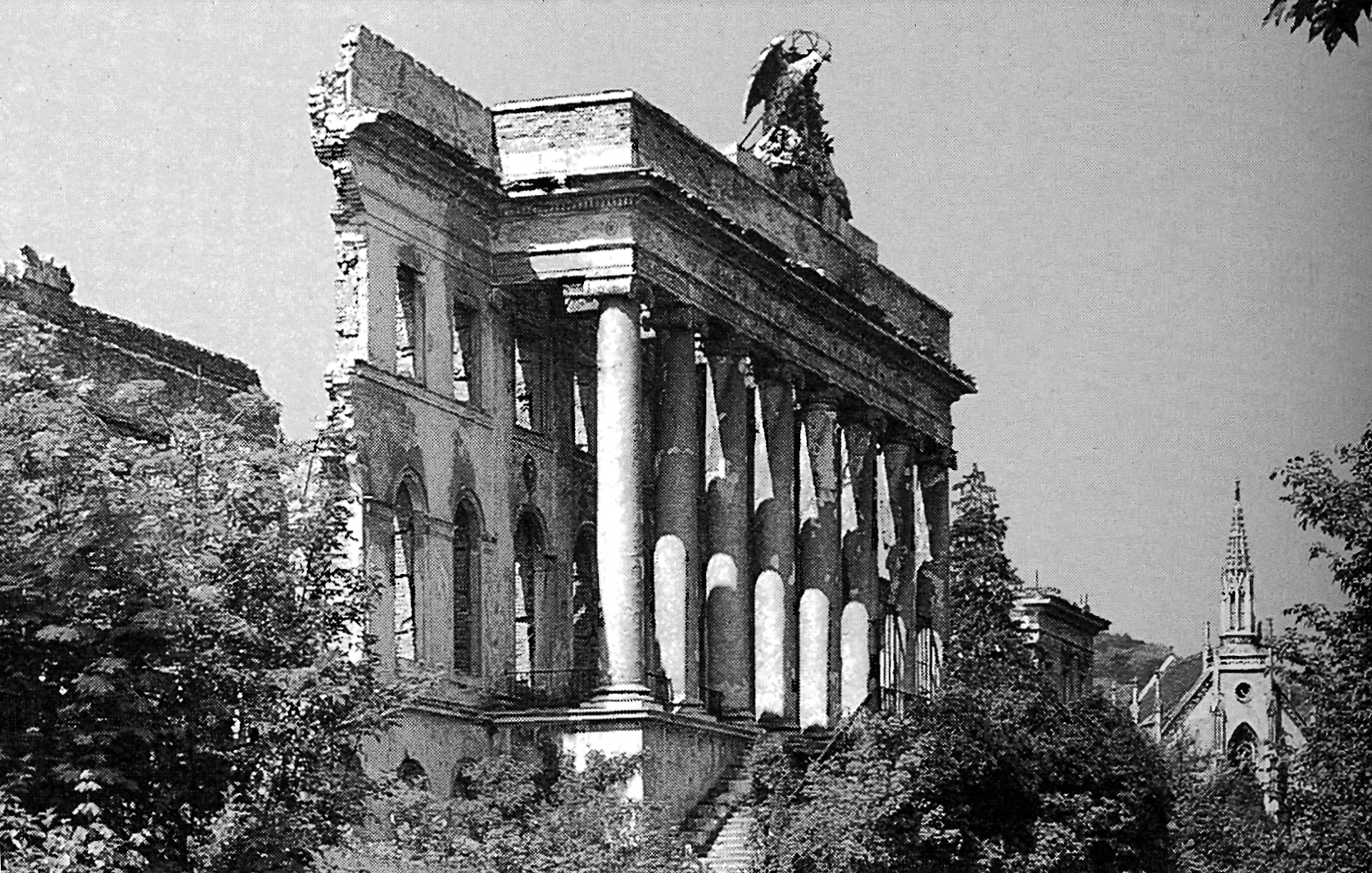
The remains of Weilburg palace before they were blown up in 1964

Red army soldiers used the palace stables as barracks for several years. The chapel in the castle park, undamaged by the fire, served as a hay storehouse for them. The palace ruins, with still-standing walls, deteriorated rapidly.

The settlement of Albrecht's estate after his death was difficult. It ended in 1967 with the transfer of the (remains of the) Weilburg palace and other properties (e.g., the Halbturn palace in Burgenland), to his nephew, Paul Freiherr von Waldbott-Bassenheim (1924–2008), the son of his sister Maria Alice of Habsburg-Teschen (1893–1962).

The new owner's lawyers applied to have the monument protection of the palace lifted by the monument office in order to sell the property more favourably. After a lengthy process, their endeavours succeeded: in the first and second instances, the Federal Monuments Office and the Ministry of Education, decided to maintain monument protection at least for a part of the building, but the Administrative Court as the third and final instance lifted it, with the peculiar reasoning that the protected building had perished and the remaining ruins were not to be considered identical with it. Due to misunderstanding and ignorance, the remains of this beautiful palace were no longer protected.

=== Modern times ===
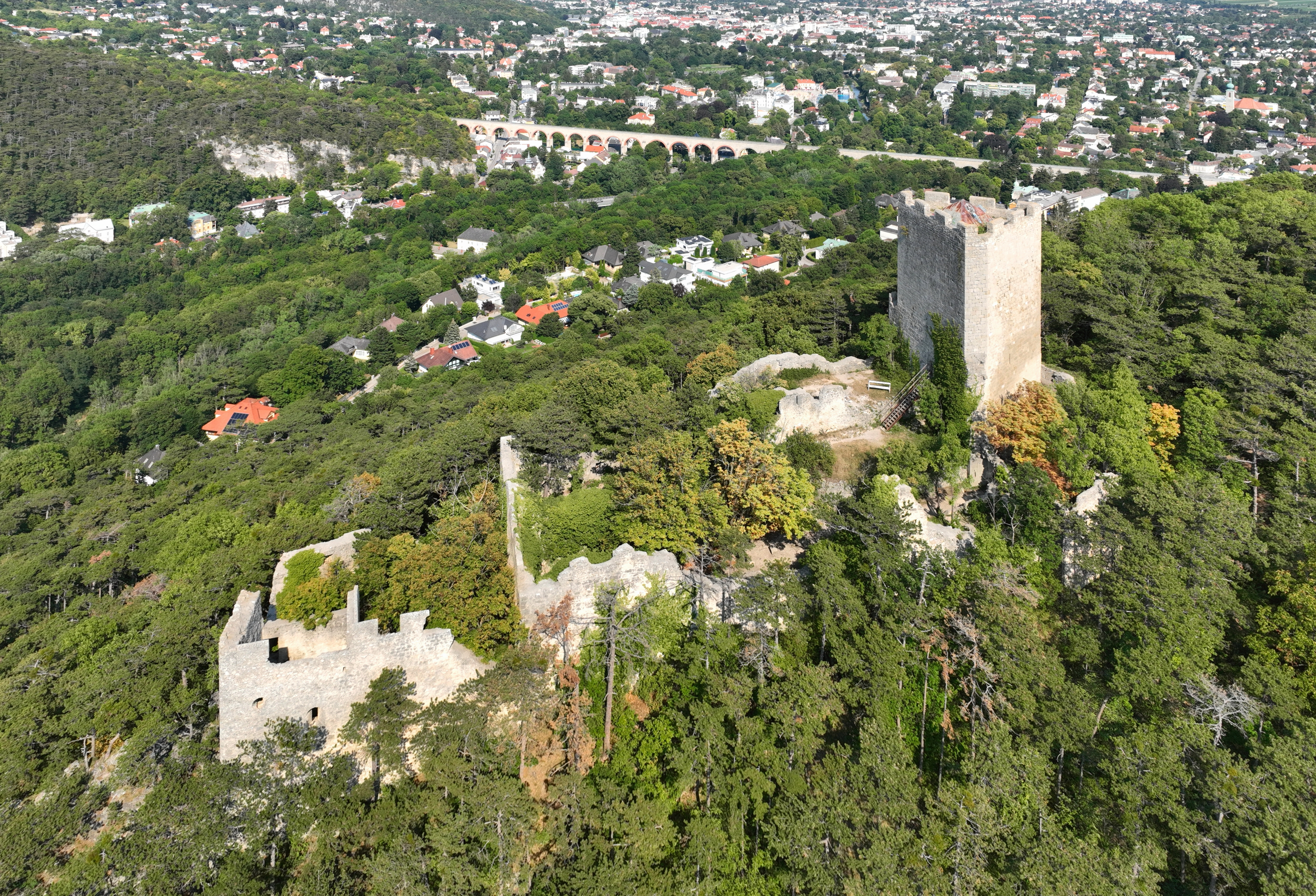
The ruins of Rauheneck castle look down at the residential area, where once was the Weilburg palace

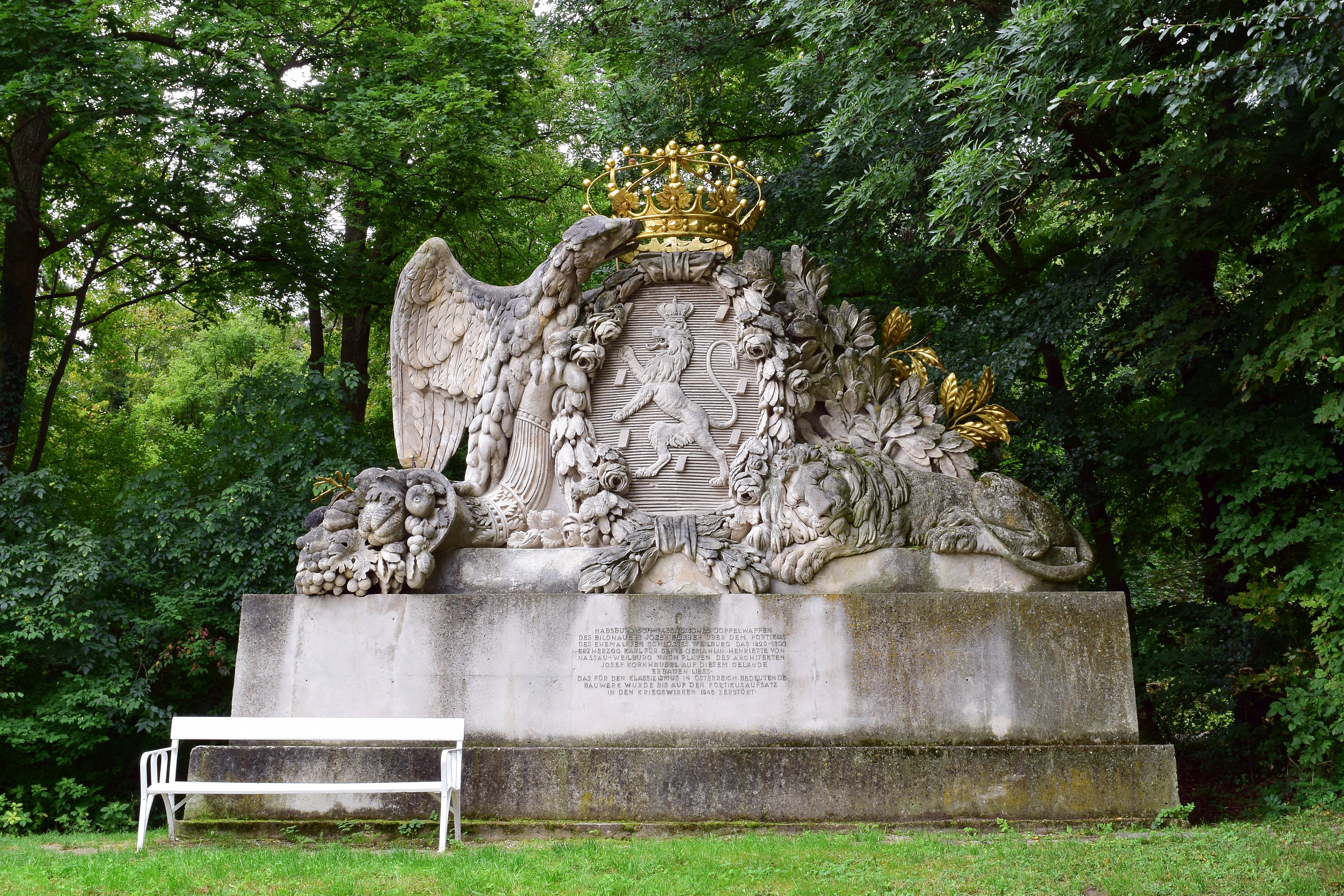
The last remain of the palace: the coat of arms uniting the Nassau lion with the Habsburg eagle

The Baden municipality bought the Rauhenecker forest behind the palace, as well as the park. The location of the palace changed several times until it was used for the construction of a residential area starting in 1964.

On 19 August 1964, the remains of the palace ruins were blown up. Today, nothing remembers of the neoclassical palace, once presented by a loving archduke to his wife. Only, the coat of arms, which once decorated the palace, is left in the former palace park. It is popularly known as the “Gravestone of the Weilburg palace”.

==== Gallery: Floor plans of Weilburg palace by Joseph Kornhäusel ====
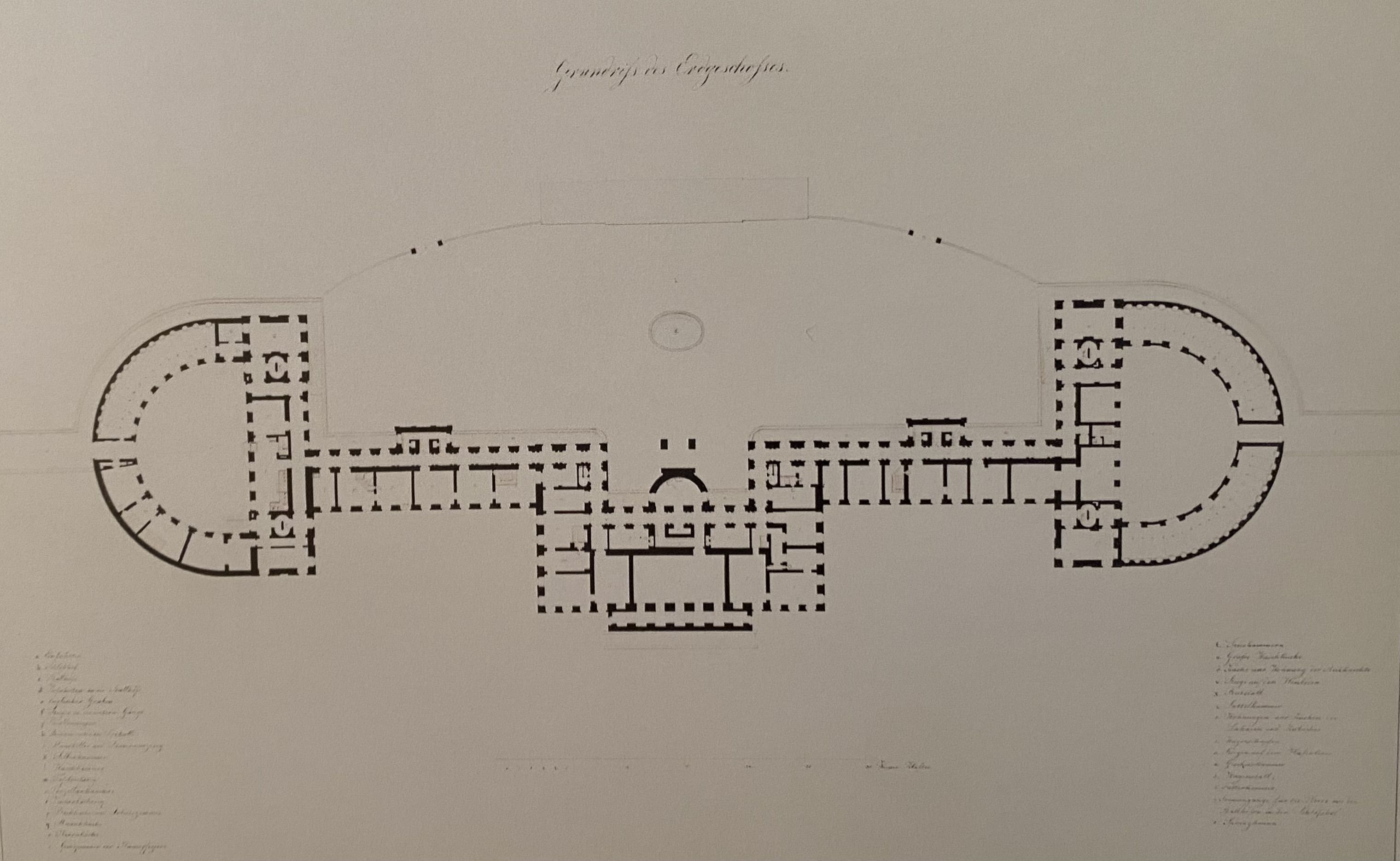
Ground floor plan

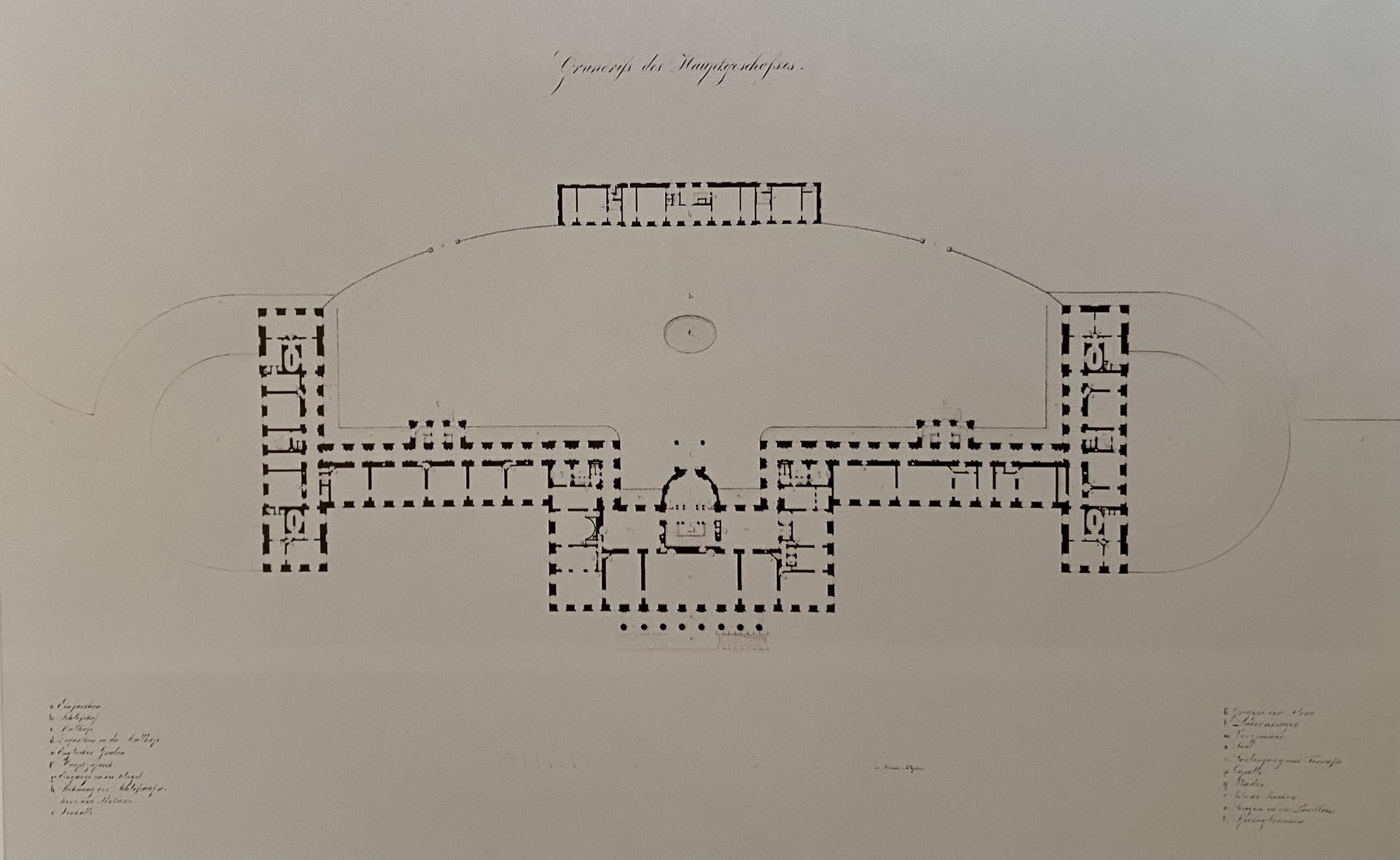
First floor plan

== Literature ==
- de Martin, Waltraud (1987). Die Weilburg in Baden bei Wien (in German). Wiener Neustadt: Weilburg Verlag. ISBN 3-900100-57-8.
- Kräftner, Johann, ed. (1988). Im Schatten der Weilburg. Baden im Biedermeier. Eine Ausstellung der Stadtgemeinde Baden im Frauenbad vom 23. September 1988–31. Jänner 1989 (in German). Baden: Grasl. ISBN 3-85098-186-X.
- Haider, Edgar (2006). "Schloss Weilburg, Baden bei Wien. Geschenk für eine geliebte Frau". Verlorene Pracht. Geschichten von zerstörten Bauten (in German). Hildesheim: Gerstenberg Verlag. p. 191. ISBN 978-3-8067-2949-8.
- Nezval, Bettina (2010). Josep Kornhäusel Lustschlösser und Theater (in German). Horn: Verlag Berger. pp. 16–25. ISBN 978-3-99024-342-8.
- Nezval, Bettina (2015). Schloss Weilburg in Baden – Symbol einer Liebe (in German). Baden: Stadtgemeinde Baden. ISBN 978-3-99024-342-8.
- Kräftner, Johann (2016). Klassizismus und Biedermeier in Mitteleuropa Band 1 - Architektur und Innenraumgestaltuing in Österreich und seinen Kronländern 1780-1850 (in German). Wien: Brandstätter Verlag. pp. 301–388. ISBN 978-3850338219.
