= Escuela de Gastronomía Mexicana =

Mexican cooking school

The Escuela de Gastronomía Mexicana (School of Mexican Gastronomy) is the only school dedicated to the research, promotion and development of high Mexican cuisine. It was opened by Yuri de Gotari and Edmundo Escamilla who have studied and researched Mexican cuisine from anthropological, social, historical and cultural perspectives for over two decades.

The school offers conferences, and courses in theory and practice, such as Mexican gastronomy and the cinema, and writing about food. The school also offers certificates and B.A.s in Mexican Gastronomy. Classes include those given by anthropologists, historians as well as more traditional classes about cooking techniques and ingredients. Teachers and students come from abroad to teach and learn with the goal of developing Mexican cuisine at an international level. It also cooperates with the Museo Nacional de Historia Castillo de Chapultepec (National Historical Museum at the Castle of Chapultepec and have given courses in Spain, Austria, Greece, Hungary, Italy, the Czech Republic, the United States, Paraguay, Peru and Venezuela, as well teaching at local schools such as Instituto Tecnológico Autónomo de México Their work has been recognized by La Academia Española de Gastronomía, the Cofradía de la Buena Mesa de España and Asociacion Euro-Toques.

It is located at Calle Coahuila 207, Colonia Roma in Mexico City.
