= Carl Gangolf Kayser =

Austrian architect

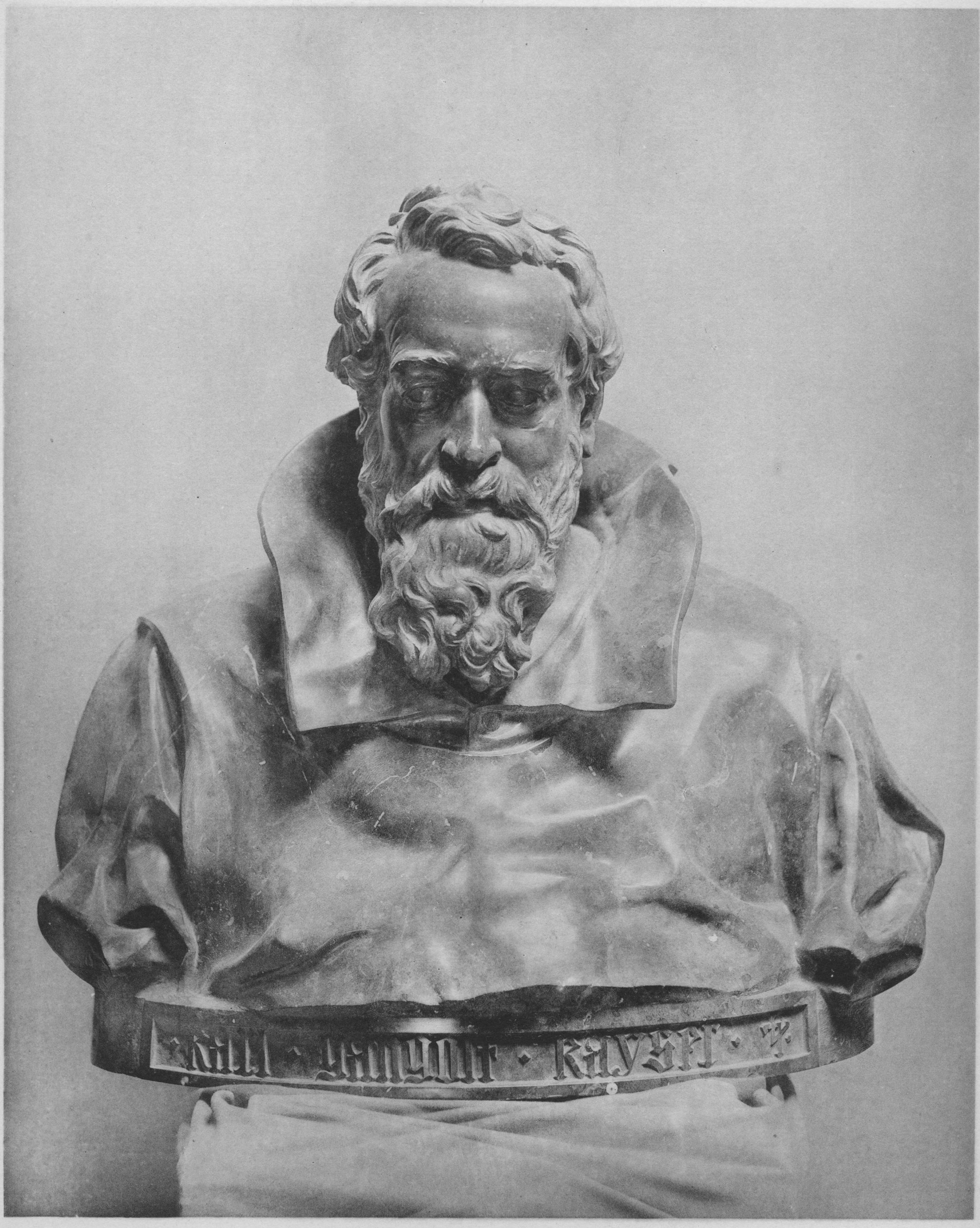
Portrait bust of Kayser by Victor Tilgner

Carl Gangolf Kayser (or Carl Gangolph Kaiser; born 12 February 1837, in Vienna; died 2 September 1895) was an Austrian architect at the service of Emperor Maximilian I of Mexico, during the Second Mexican Empire. In the later part of his life he returned to Austria and worked on restoring medieval castles.

== Life ==
Carl Gangolf Kayser was enrolled in the sculpture class of the Academy of Fine Arts of Vienna and in that of Munich. So far, we do not know about any formal architectural studies of Kayser. He was an auditor to architecture with Friedrich von Schmidt in Vienna and specialized later on in Mediaeval and Gothic revival architecture.

After several trips during the Second Mexican Empire, he was appointed court architect by Emperor Maximilian I of Mexico in 1866. After arriving in Mexico City, he planned various architectural projects in the Palacio Nacional and the Castle of Chapultepec, and continued the work of the architects Julius Hofmann and Ramón Rodríguez Arangoiti, who were the main builders of Chapultepec Castle, in Mexico. The Prefect of the Court officially notified Kayser of his appointment as Court Architect in February 1866, almost two years after the arrival of emperor Maximilian in Mexico. Drawings of other Mexican projects exist in archives in Mexico City, but they were not realized. He also had to abandon most of his plans for Chapultepec Castle after the execution of Emperor Maximilian. Kayser is an interesting figure in part because of all the drawings of projected buildings he left behind in Mexico, while only a few were completed.

After the collapse of the Mexican Empire in 1867, Kayser returned to Austria, where he restored several medieval castles, such as Kreuzenstein, Hardegg and Liechtenstein Castle near Vienna.

== Selected works ==
- Plans for Chapultepec Castle
- Kreuzenstein Castle
- Hardegg Castle
- Liechtenstein Castle

== Gallery ==
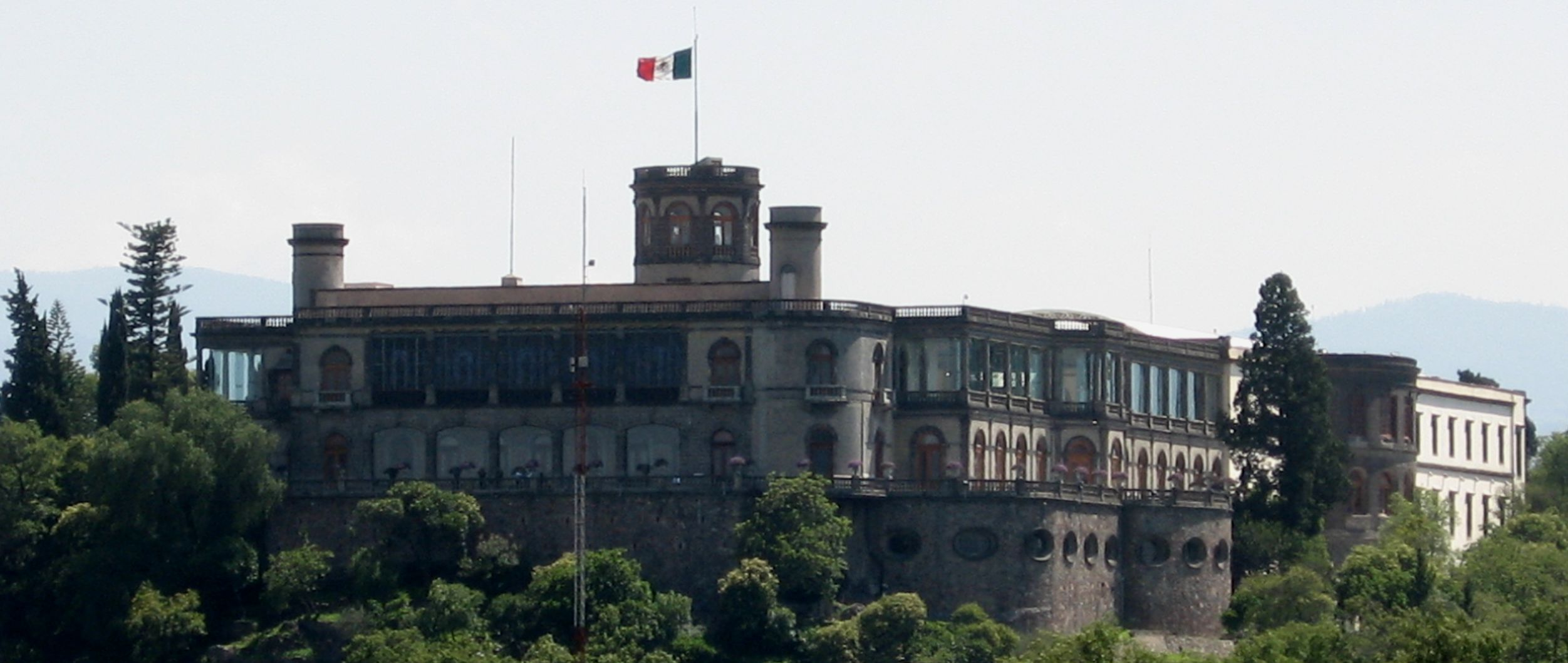
Chapultepec Castle, Mexico

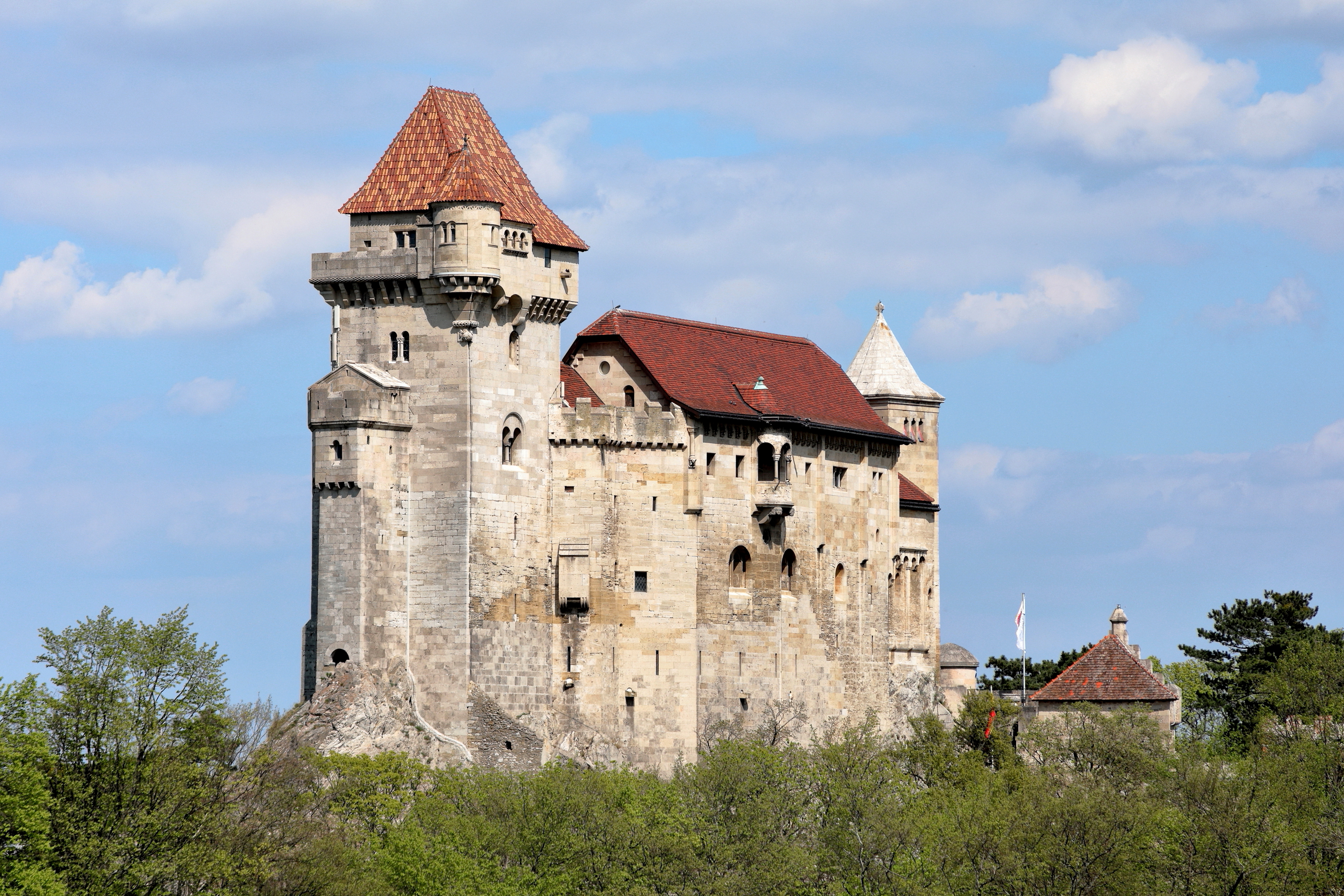
Liechtenstein Castle, Austria

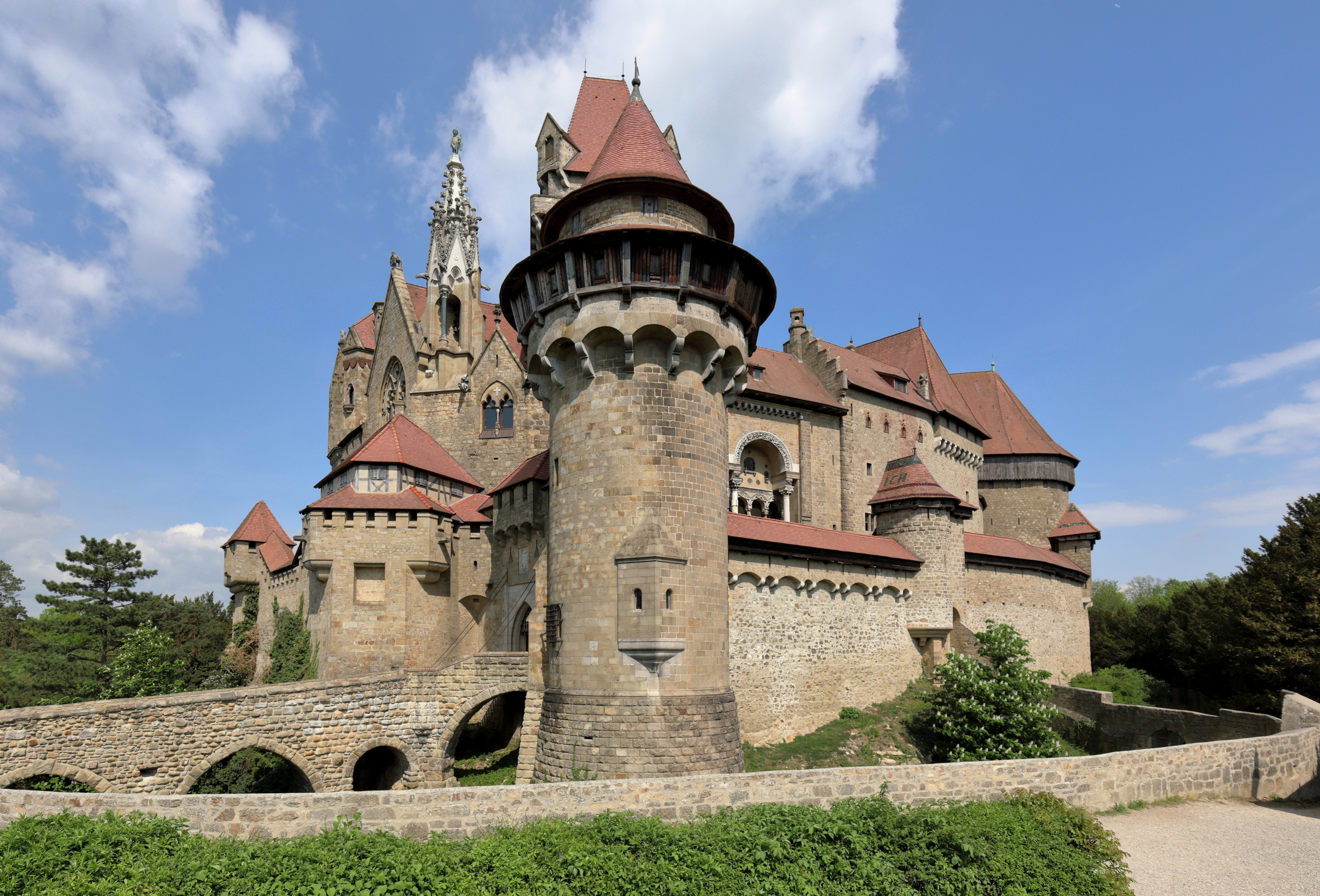
Kreuzenstein Castle, Austria

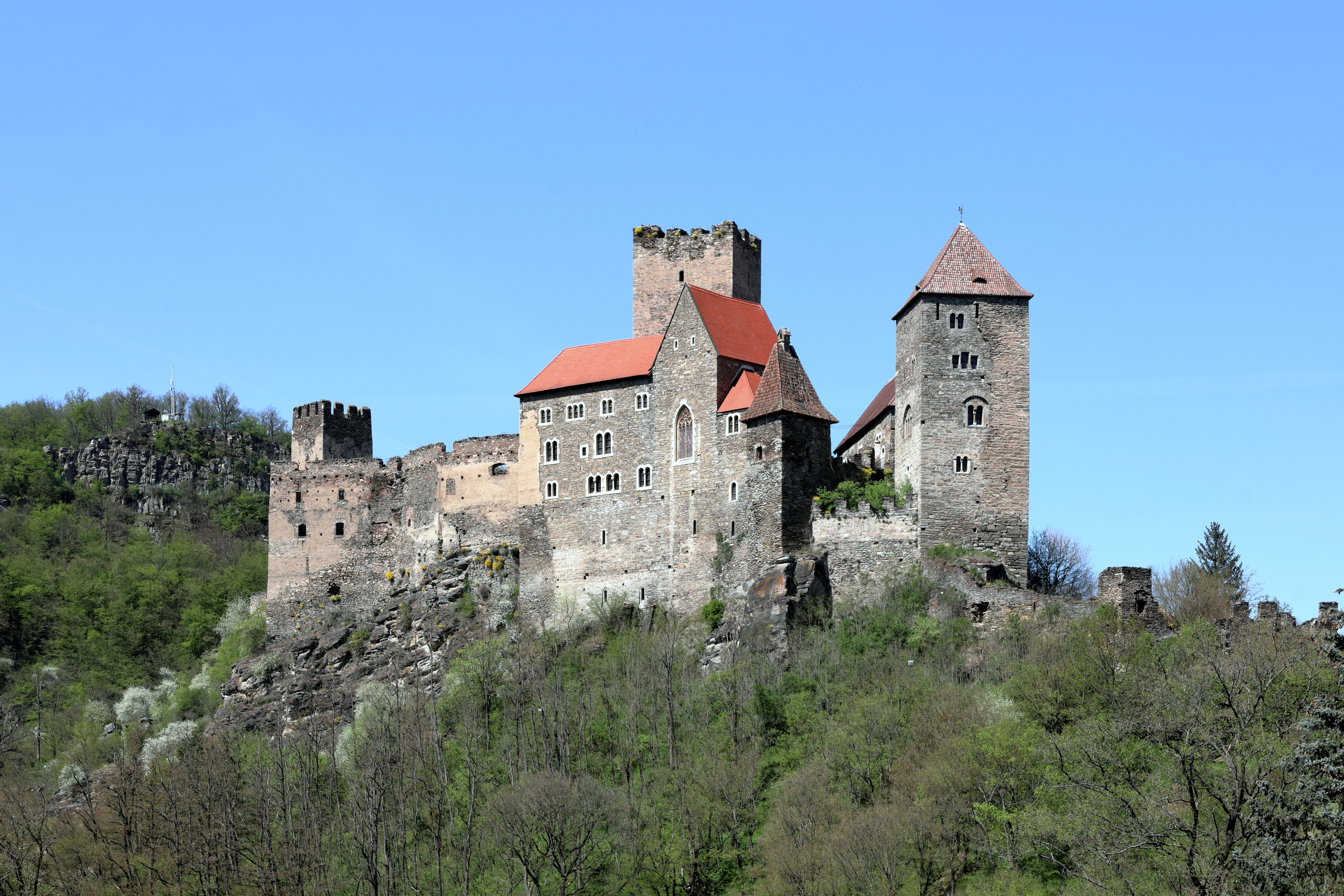
Hardegg Castle, Austria
