= Chapultepec Castle =

Museum in Mexico City, Mexico

Coordinates: 19°25′14″N 99°10′54″W

- Castillo de Chapultepec
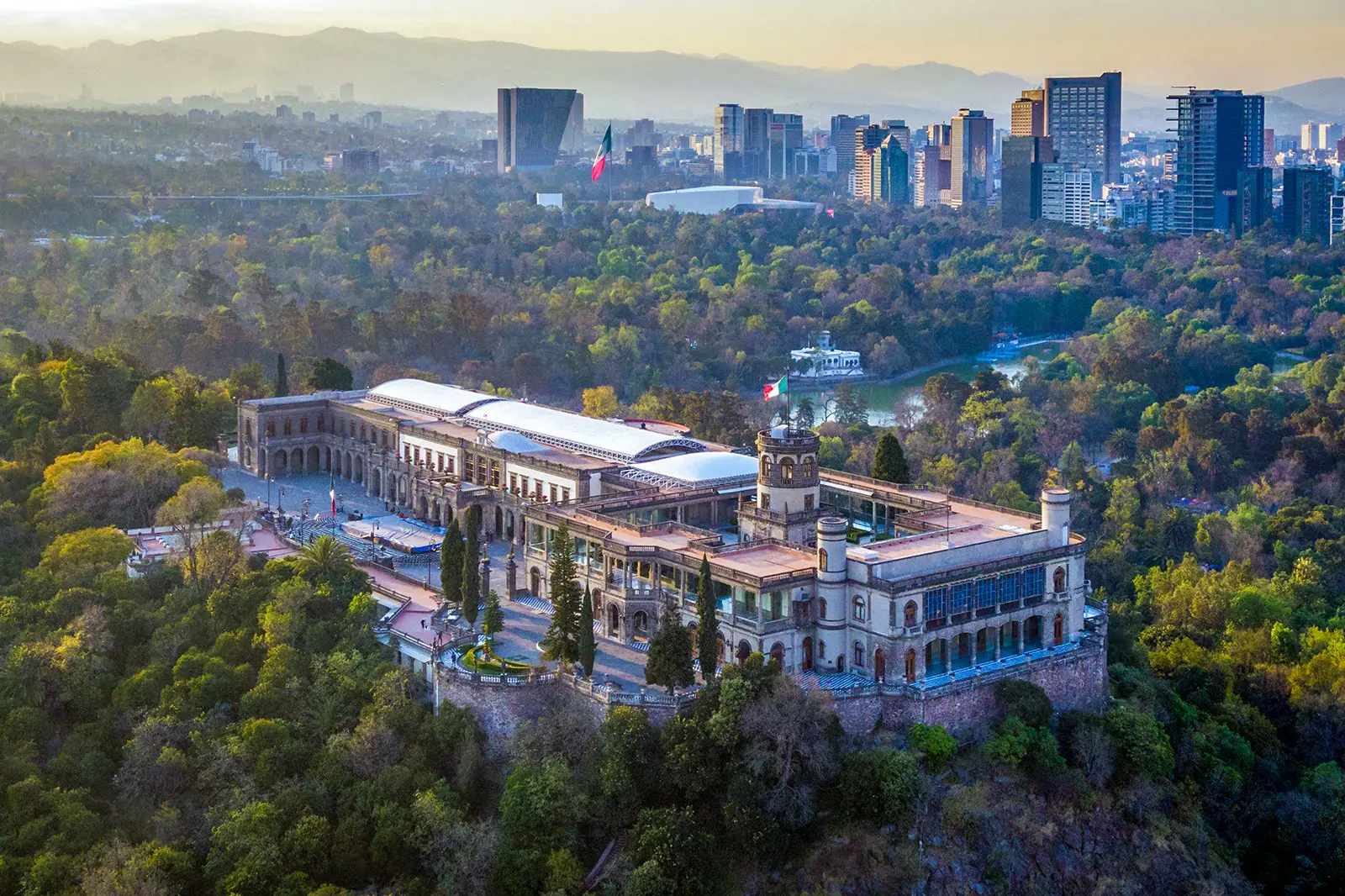
- A view of Chapultepec Castle from the West

General information
- Architectural style: Neo-romanticism, Neoclassical, Neo-Gothic
- Location: Miguel Hidalgo, Mexico City, Mexico
- Elevation: 2,325 metres (7,628 ft) above sea level
- Current tenants: Museo Nacional de Historia
- Construction started: c. 1785
- Completed: 1864

Height
- Height: 220 feet (67 m)

Design and construction
- Architects: Eleuterio Méndez, Ramón Rodríguez Arangoiti, Julius Hofmann, Carl Gangolf Kayser, Carlos Schaffer
- Other designers: Maximilian I of Mexico

UNESCO World Heritage Site
- Official name: Part of the Historic center of Mexico City
- Type: Cultural
- Criteria: i, ii, iii, iv, v
- Designated: 1987 (11th session)
- Reference no.: 412
- Region: Latin America and the Caribbean

Chapultepec Castle (Spanish: Castillo de Chapultepec) is located on top of Chapultepec Hill in Mexico City's Chapultepec park. The name Chapultepec is the Nahuatl word chapoltepēc which means "on the hill of the grasshopper". It is located at the entrance to Chapultepec park, at a height of 2,325 metres (7,628 ft) above sea level.

The site of the hill was a sacred place for Aztecs, and the buildings atop it have served several purposes during its history, including serving as a military academy, imperial residence, presidential residence, observatory, and since February 1939, the National Museum of History. Chapultepec Castle, along with Iturbide Palace, also in Mexico City, are the only royal palaces in North America which were inhabited by monarchs.

It was built during the Viceroyalty of New Spain as a summer house for the highest colonial administrator, the viceroy. It was given various uses, from a gunpowder warehouse to a military academy in 1841. It was remodeled and added to and became the official residence of Emperor Maximilian I of Mexico and his consort Empress Carlota during the Second Mexican Empire (1864–67). In 1882, President Manuel González declared it the official residence of the president. With few exceptions, all succeeding presidents lived there until 1934, when President Lázaro Cárdenas stayed at Los Pinos instead, turning the castle into a museum in 1939.

== Viceregal period ==
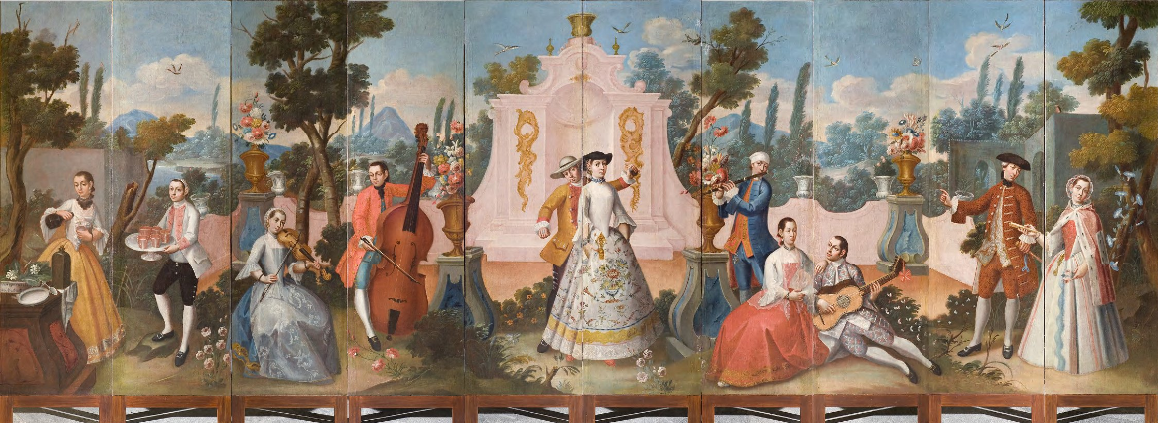
Biombo. Sarao [party] in a garden of Chapultepec, anonymous painter, ca. 1780-1790, Mexico City. National Museum of History of Chapultepec Castle.

In 1785, Viceroy Bernardo de Gálvez ordered the construction of a stately home for himself at the highest point of Chapultepec Hill. Francisco Bambitelli, Lieutenant Colonel of the Spanish Army and engineer, drew up the blueprint. In August 1785, construction began. After Bambitelli's departure to Havana, Captain Manuel Agustín Mascaró took over the leadership of the project, and during his tenure the works proceeded at a rapid pace.

Mascaró was accused of building a fortress with the intent of rebelling against the Spanish Crown from there. Viceroy de Gálvez died suddenly on November 8, 1786, fueling speculation that he was poisoned. No evidence has yet been found which supports this claim.

Lacking a head engineer, the Spanish Crown ordered that the building be auctioned at a price equivalent to one-fifth of the quantity thus far spent on its construction. After finding no buyers, Viceroy Juan Vicente de Güemes Pacheco de Padilla y Horcasitas intended the building to house the General Archive of the Kingdom of the New Spain. That idea did not come to fruition, despite already having the blueprints adapted for this purpose.

In 1803, German scientist Alexander von Humboldt visited the site and condemned the Royal Treasury's sale of the palace's windows to raise funds for the Crown. In 1806, the building was bought by the municipal government of Mexico City.

== Independence ==
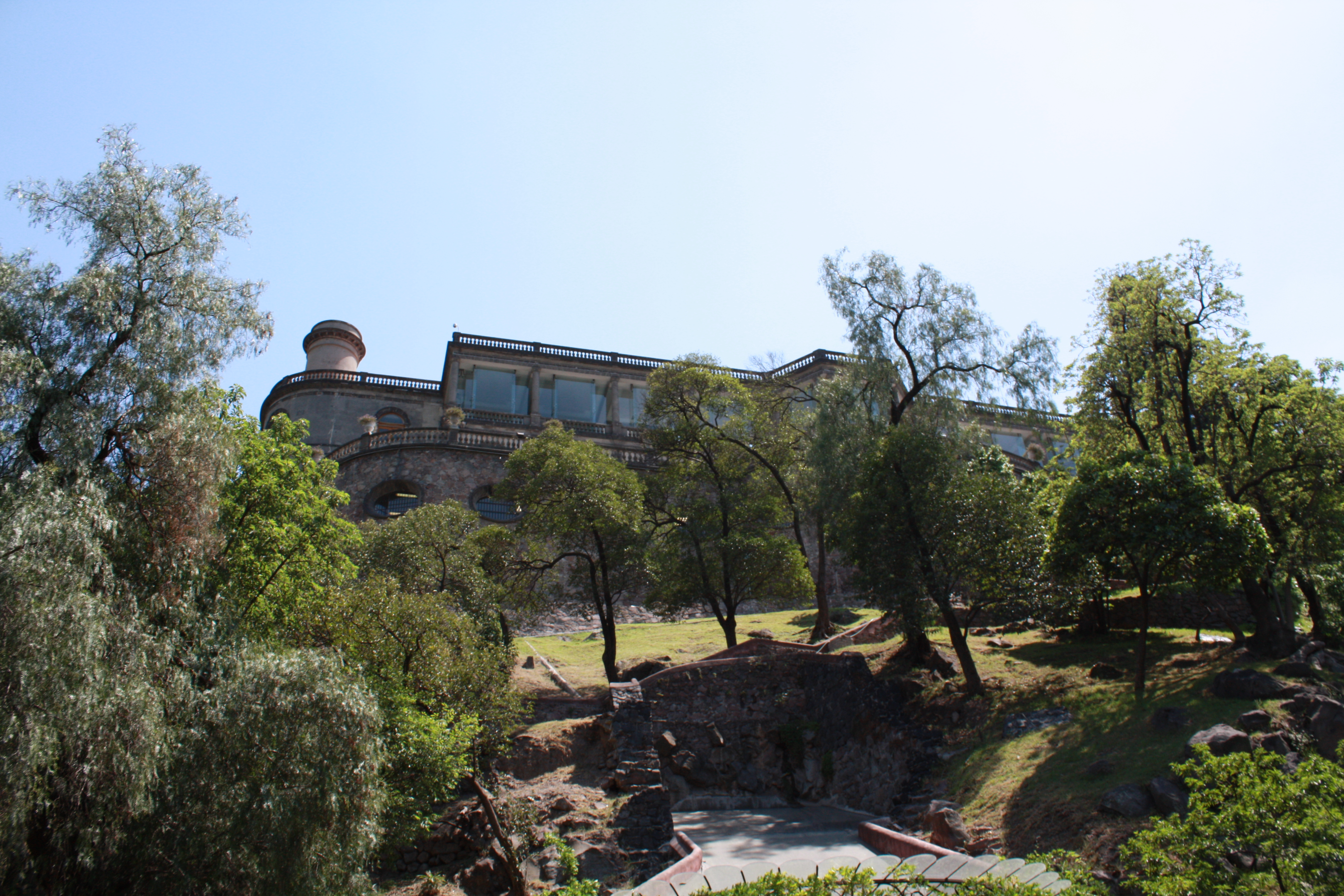
A view of the castle from within Chapultepec park.

Chapultepec Castle was abandoned during the Mexican War of Independence (1810–1821) and for many years later, until 1833. In 1833 the building became the location of the Military College (Military Academy) for cadet training. Several structural modifications were made, including the addition of the watchtower known as Caballero Alto ("Tall Knight").

During the Battle of Chapultepec, Mexican troops stood strong and preferred to face death defending their country, as opposed to surrendering to American forces. On September 13, 1847, the Niños Héroes ("Boy Heroes") died defending the castle while it was taken by United States forces during the Battle of Chapultepec of the Mexican–American War. They are honored with a large mural on the ceiling above the main entrance to the castle.

The United States Marine Corps honors its role in the Battle of Chapultepec and the subsequent occupation of Mexico City through the first line of the "Marines' Hymn", From the Halls of Montezuma. Marine Corps tradition maintains that the red stripe worn on the trousers of officers and noncommissioned officers, and commonly known as the blood stripe, commemorates the high number of Marine NCOs and officers killed storming the castle of Chapultepec in September 1847. As noted, the usage "Halls of Montezuma" is factually wrong - as the building was erected by the Spanish rulers of Mexico, more than three centuries after the Aztec Emperor Montezuma was overthrown.

Several new rooms were built on the second floor of the palace during the tenure of President Miguel Miramón, who was also an alumnus of the Military Academy.

== Second Mexican Empire ==
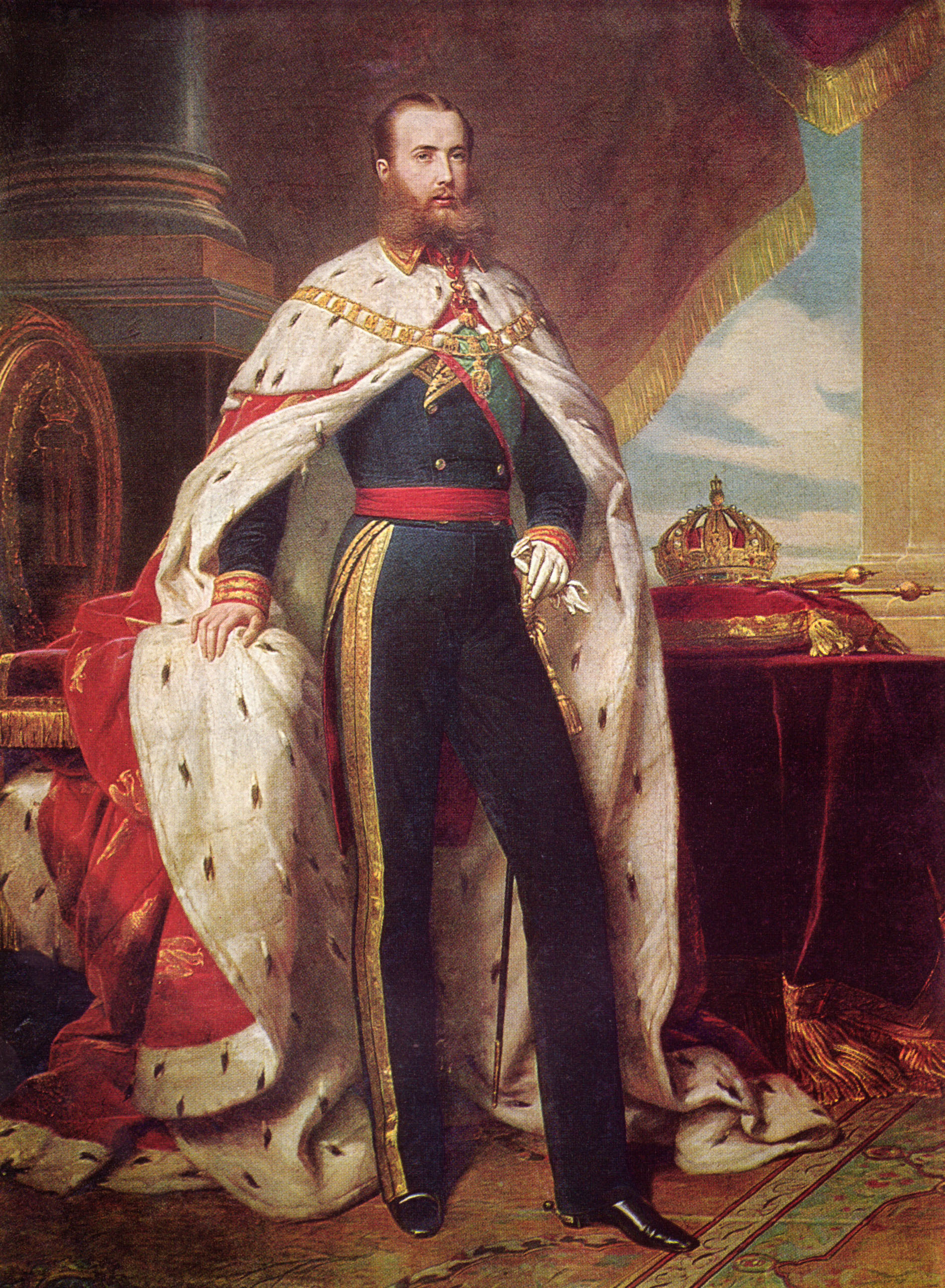
Maximilian I of Mexico by Winterhalter, 1864. This portrait, along with the Empress Carlota's and others, hangs in the castle's music room.

When Mexican conservatives invited Maximilian von Hapsburg to establish the Second Mexican Empire, the castle, now known as Castillo de Miravalle, became the residence of the emperor and his consort in 1864. The Emperor hired several European and Mexican architects to renovate the building for the royal couple, among them Julius Hofmann, Carl Gangolf Kayser, Carlos Schaffer, Eleuterio Méndez and Ramón Cruz Arango, The architects designed several projects in a neoclassical style and made the palace more habitable as a royal residence. European architects Kayser and Hofmann worked on several other revival castles, including Neuschwanstein Castle – built by Maximilian's Wittelsbach cousin Ludwig II of Bavaria, twenty years after Chapultepec's renovation.

Botanist Wilhelm Knechtel was in charge of creating the roof garden on the building. Additionally, the Emperor brought from Europe countless pieces of furniture, objets d'art and other fine household items that are exhibited to this day.

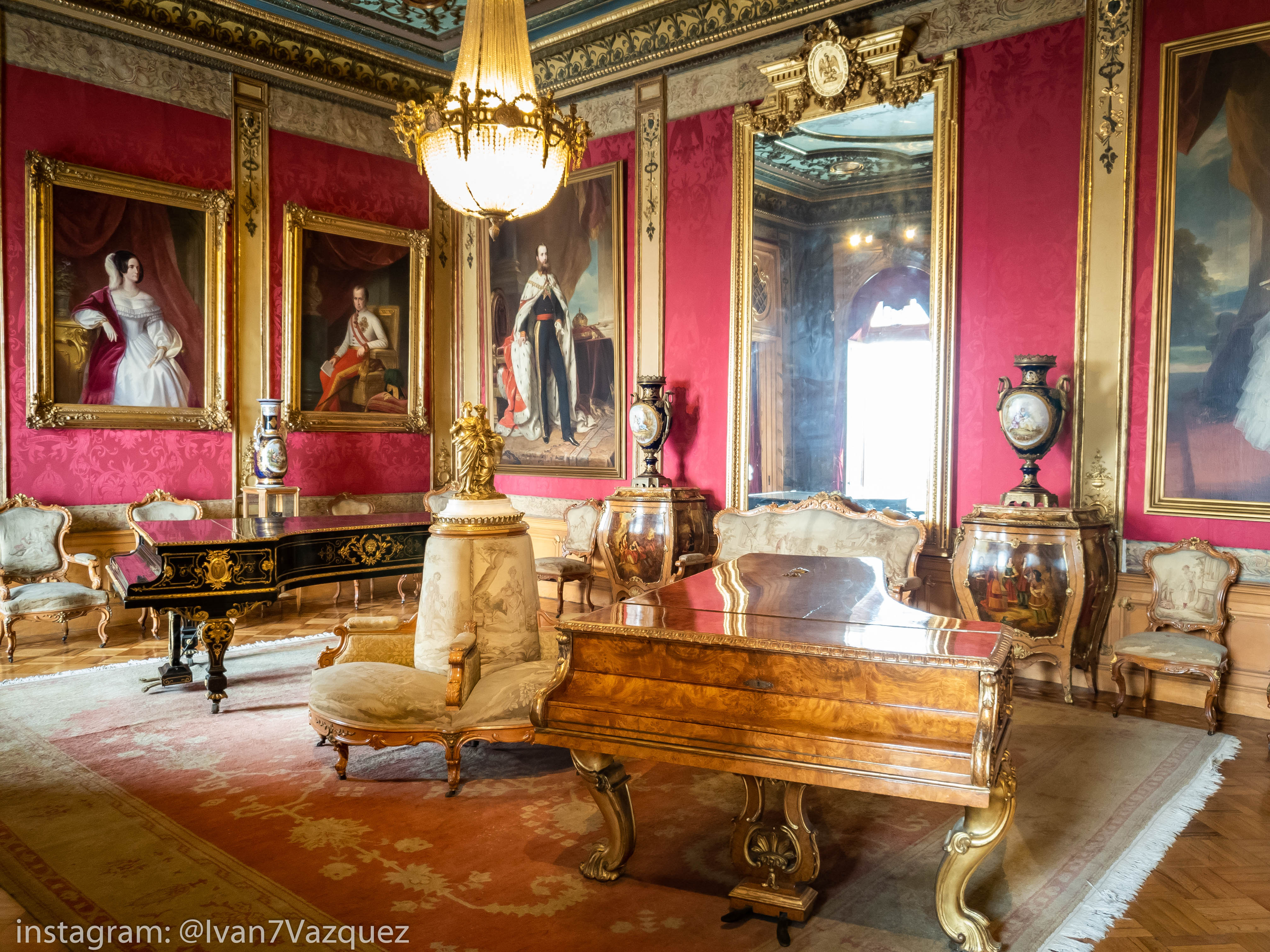
The music room in the time of the Second Mexican Empire.

At the time, as the castle was on the outskirts of Mexico City, Maximilian ordered the construction of a straight boulevard (modeled after the great boulevards of Europe, such as Vienna's Ringstrasse and the Champs-Élysées in Paris), to connect the Imperial residence with the city center. He named the new boulevard Paseo de la Emperatriz ("Promenade of the Empress") in honor of his wife Empress Carlota. Following the reestablishment of the Republic in 1867 by President Benito Juárez and the end of the civil war to oust the French invaders and defeat their Mexican conservative allies, the boulevard was renamed Paseo de la Reforma, after the Liberal reform.

== Modern era to present ==
The castle fell into disuse after the fall of the Second Mexican Empire in 1867. In 1867, the explorer James F. Elton wrote the castle was not "surpassed in beauty in any part of the world." In 1876, a decree established it as an Astronomical, Meteorological and Magnetic Observatory on the site, which was opened in 1878 during the presidency of Sebastián Lerdo de Tejada. The observatory was only functional for five years until they decided to move it to the former residence of the Archbishop in Tacubaya. The reason was to allow the return of the Colegio Militar to the premises as well as transforming the building into the presidential residence.

In 1882, the castle was given new life, when President Manuel González declared it the official residence of the President of Mexico. With few exceptions, all succeeding presidents lived there until 1934, when President Lázaro Cárdenas moved the official residence to Los Pinos, turning the castle into a museum in 1939. The palace underwent several structural changes under González and during the later years of the presidency of Porfirio Díaz (1876-1880; 1884-1911).

When Díaz was overthrown at the outbreak of the Mexican Revolution, it remained the presidential residence. Presidents Francisco I. Madero (1911–13), Venustiano Carranza (1915–20), Álvaro Obregón (1920–24), Plutarco Elías Calles (1924-28), Emilio Portes Gil, Pascual Ortiz Rubio and Abelardo Rodríguez all lived there during this time. It was then used for a time as an official guest house or residence for foreign dignitaries.

In February 1939, President Lázaro Cárdenas established Chapultepec Castle as the National Museum of History, with the collections of the former National Museum of Archaeology, History and Ethnography, now the National Museum of Cultures. The museum was opened on September 27, 1944 during the presidency of Manuel Avila Camacho. President Cárdenas moved the official Mexican presidential residence to Los Pinos, and never lived in Chapultepec Castle.

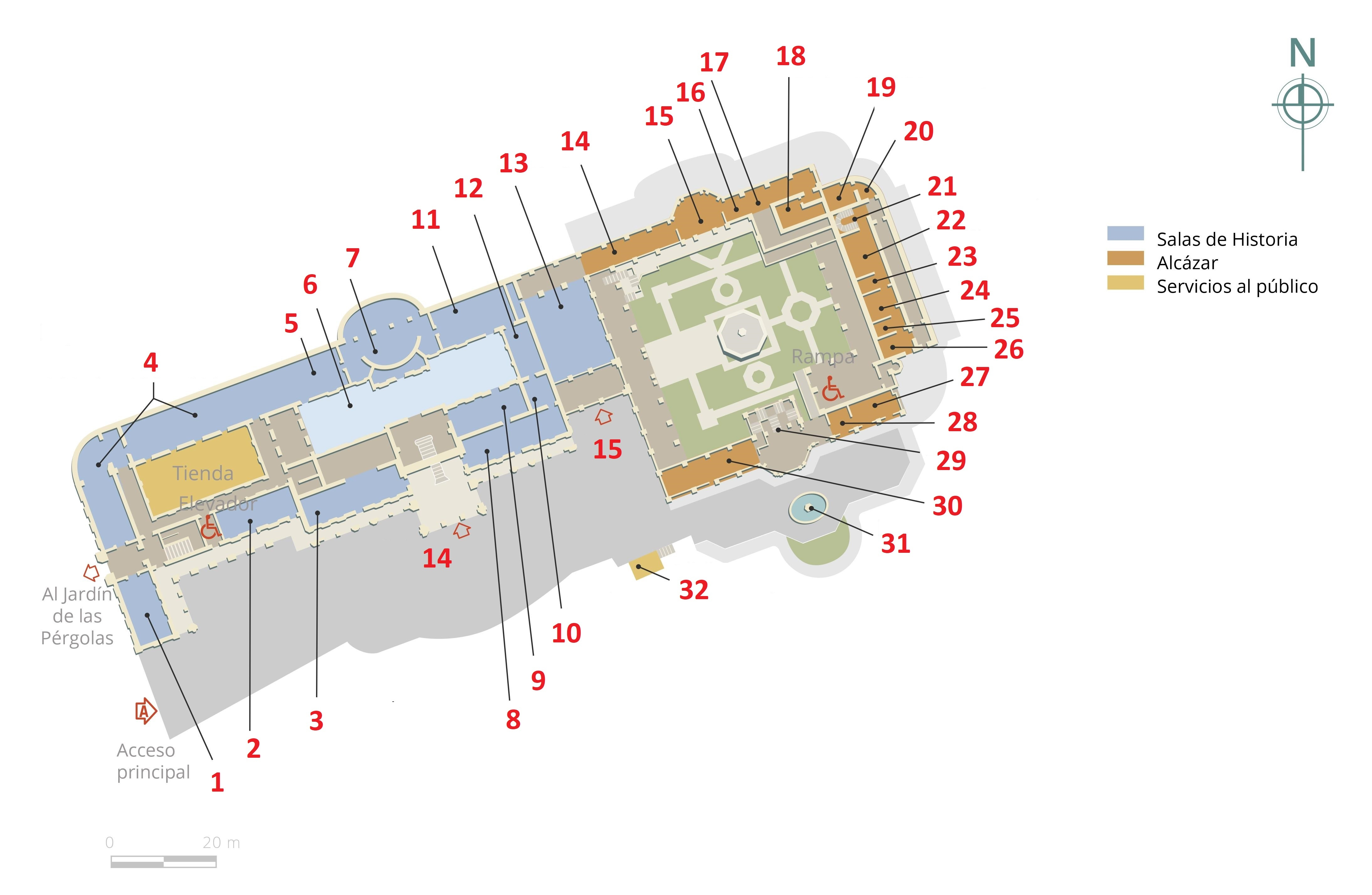
A floorplan of the castle's ground floor.

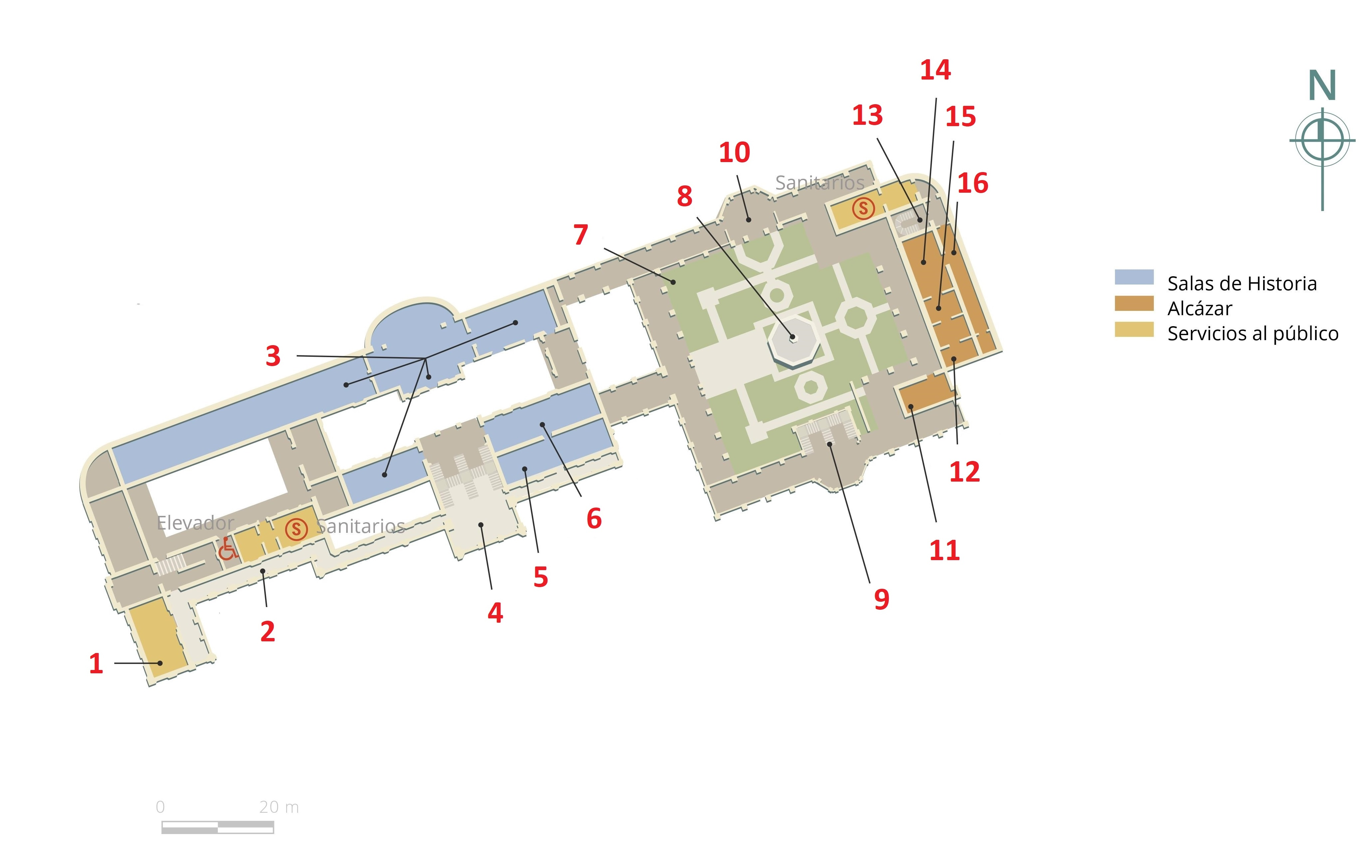
A floorplan of the castle's second floor, including gardens.

== In popular culture ==
- Chapultepec Castle was used as a model of castle architecture to design buildings such as the 13th Regiment Armory (Sumner Armory), in Bedford-Stuyvesant, Brooklyn, US.
- In the 1954 American western film Vera Cruz starring Gary Cooper and Burt Lancaster, Chapultepec was portrayed using elaborate sets and decor.
- In 1996, the castle was a film location for the Academy Award-nominated movie William Shakespeare's Romeo + Juliet starring Leonardo DiCaprio and Claire Danes. Many views of the castle as the Capulet Mansion can be seen throughout the film.
- In the 2006 video game Ghost Recon: Advanced Warfighter, a level exists in and around the castle.
- A portion of the 2022 film Bardo, False Chronicle of a Handful of Truths was also filmed at Chapultepec Castle.

== Gallery ==
Images of Chapultepec Castle and surroundings

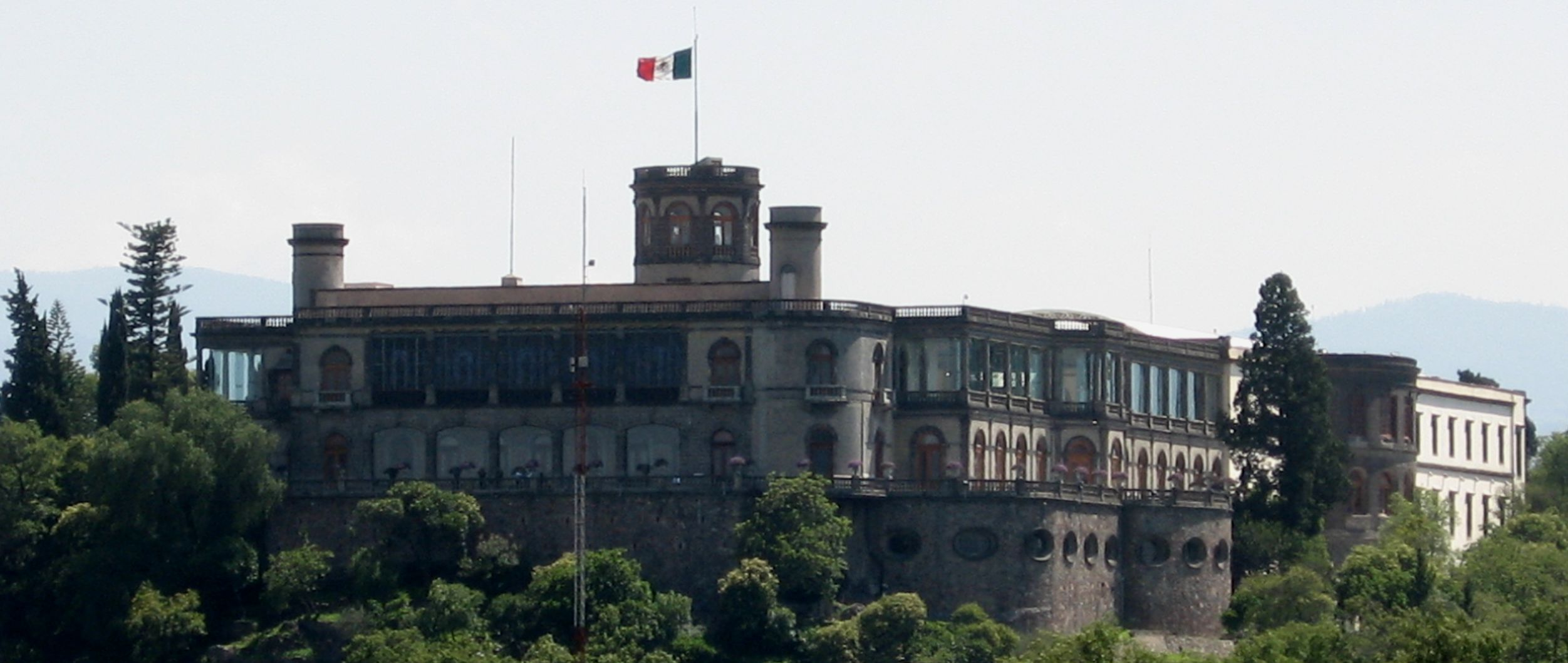
View of the castle from afar

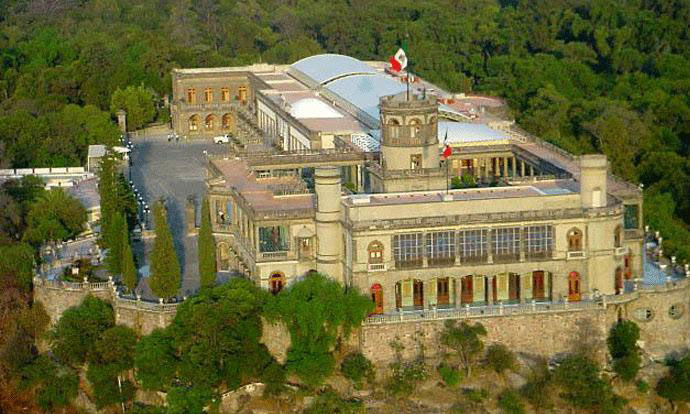
Another bird's-eye view of the castle

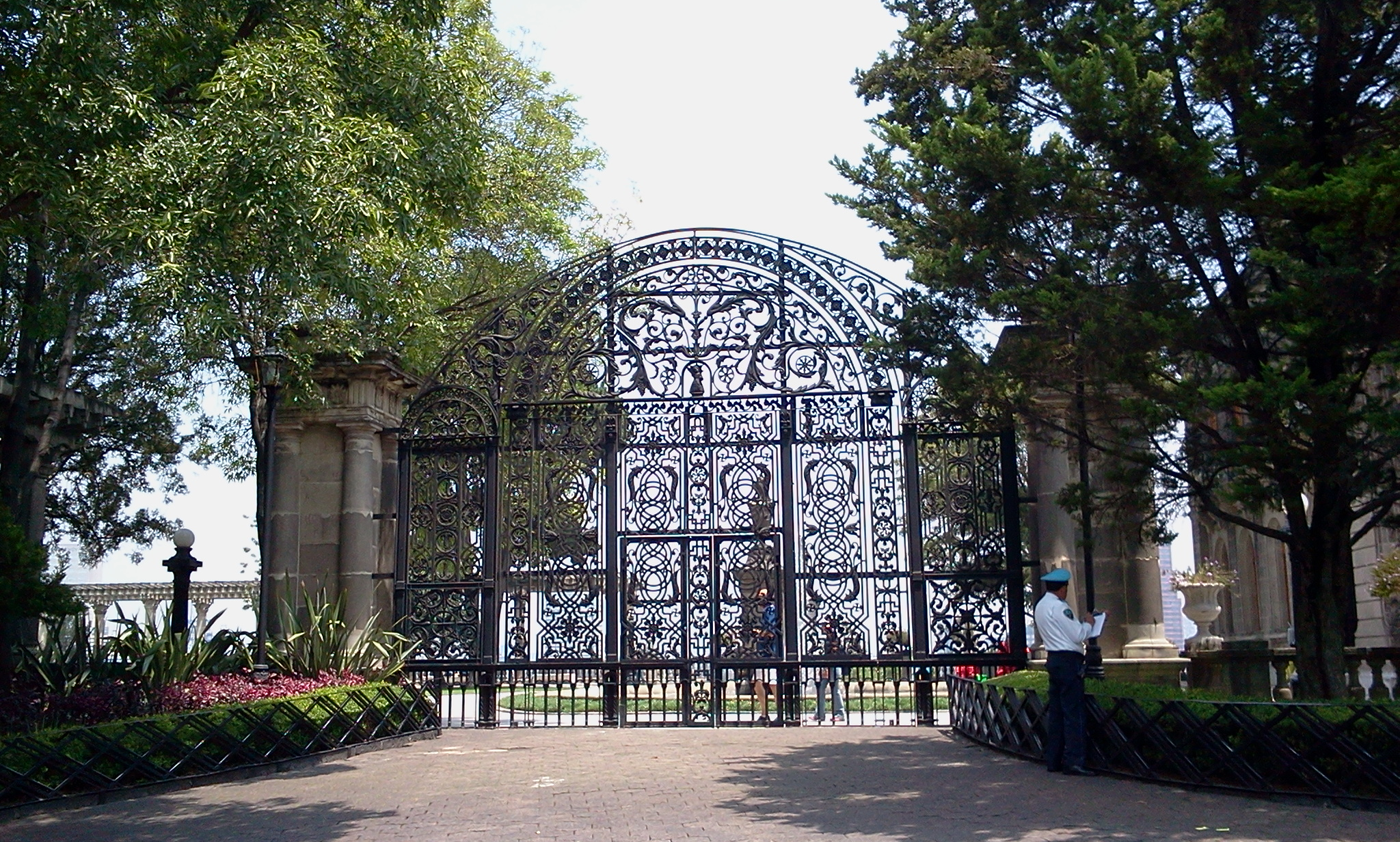
The front gates of the castle

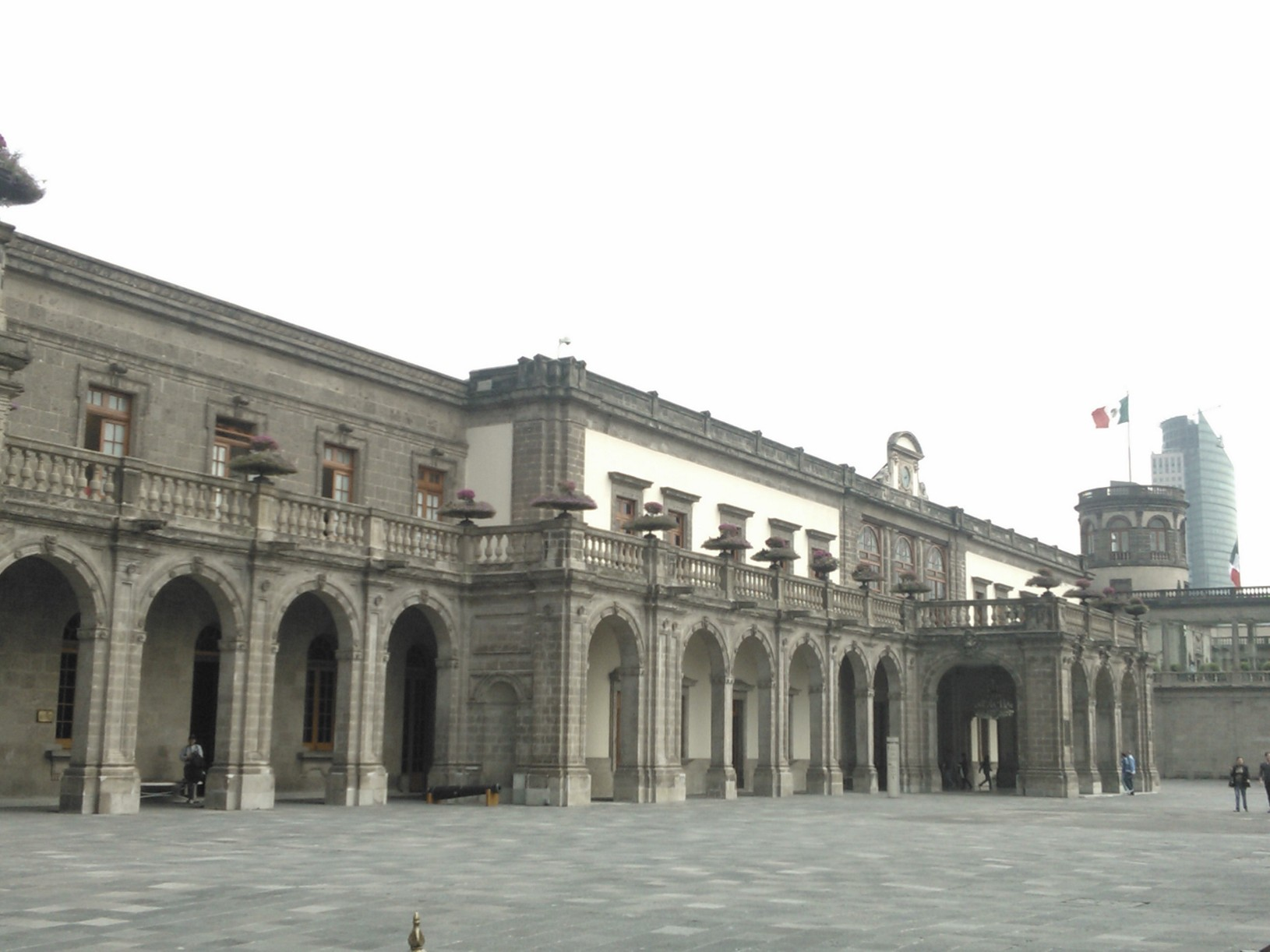
Front entrance, just beyond the gate

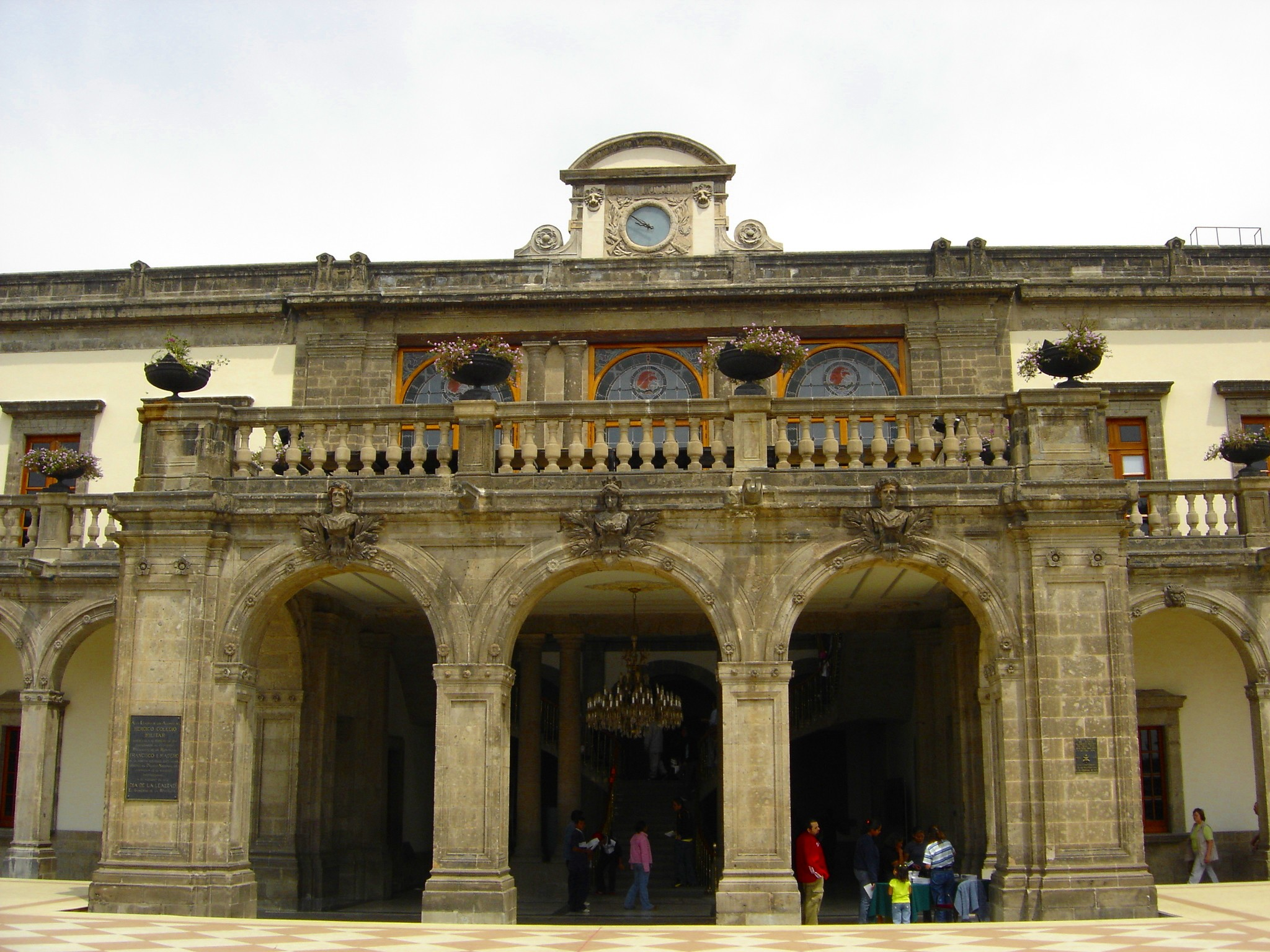
Main entrance into the castle

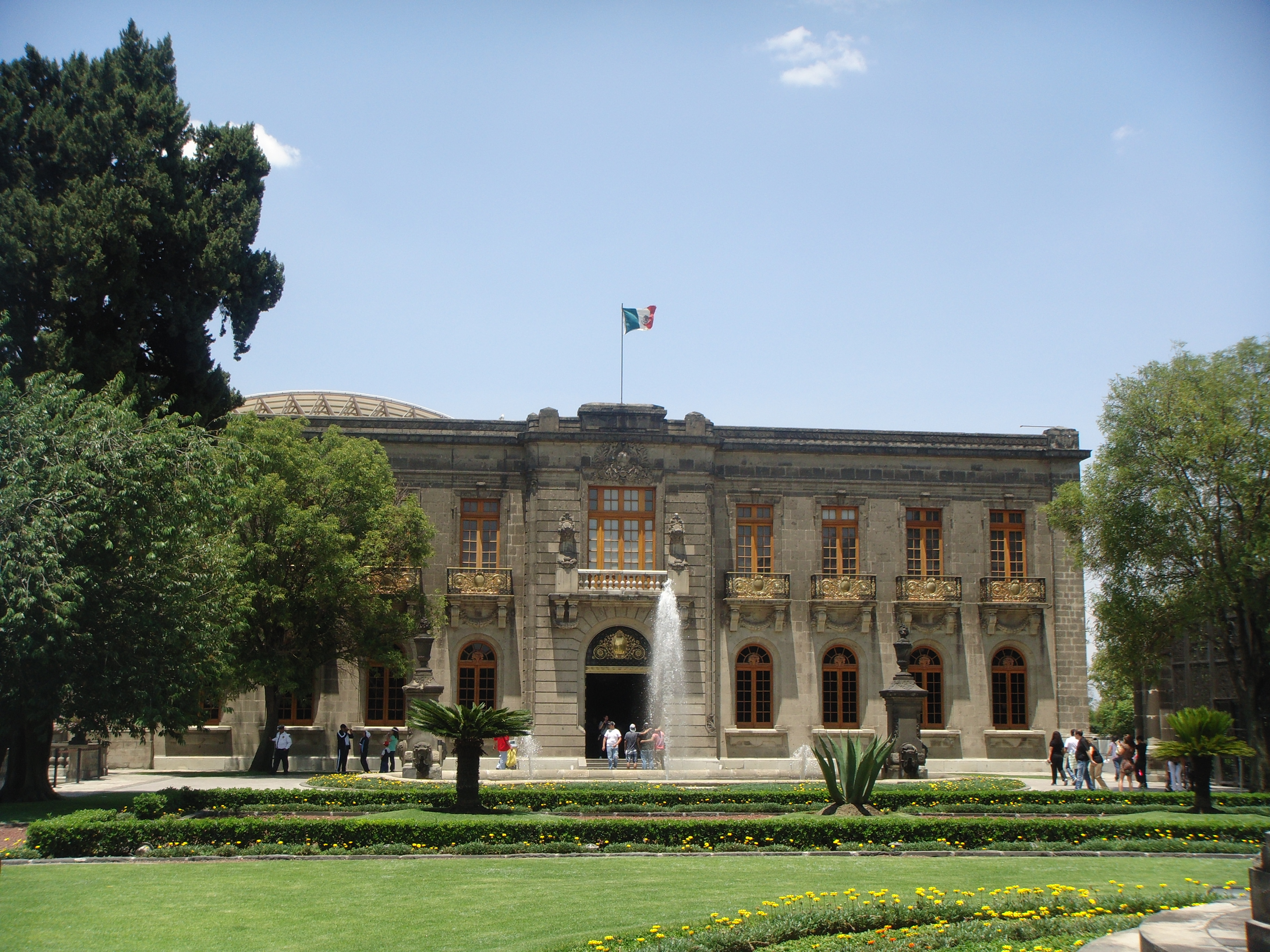
Side entrance into the museum

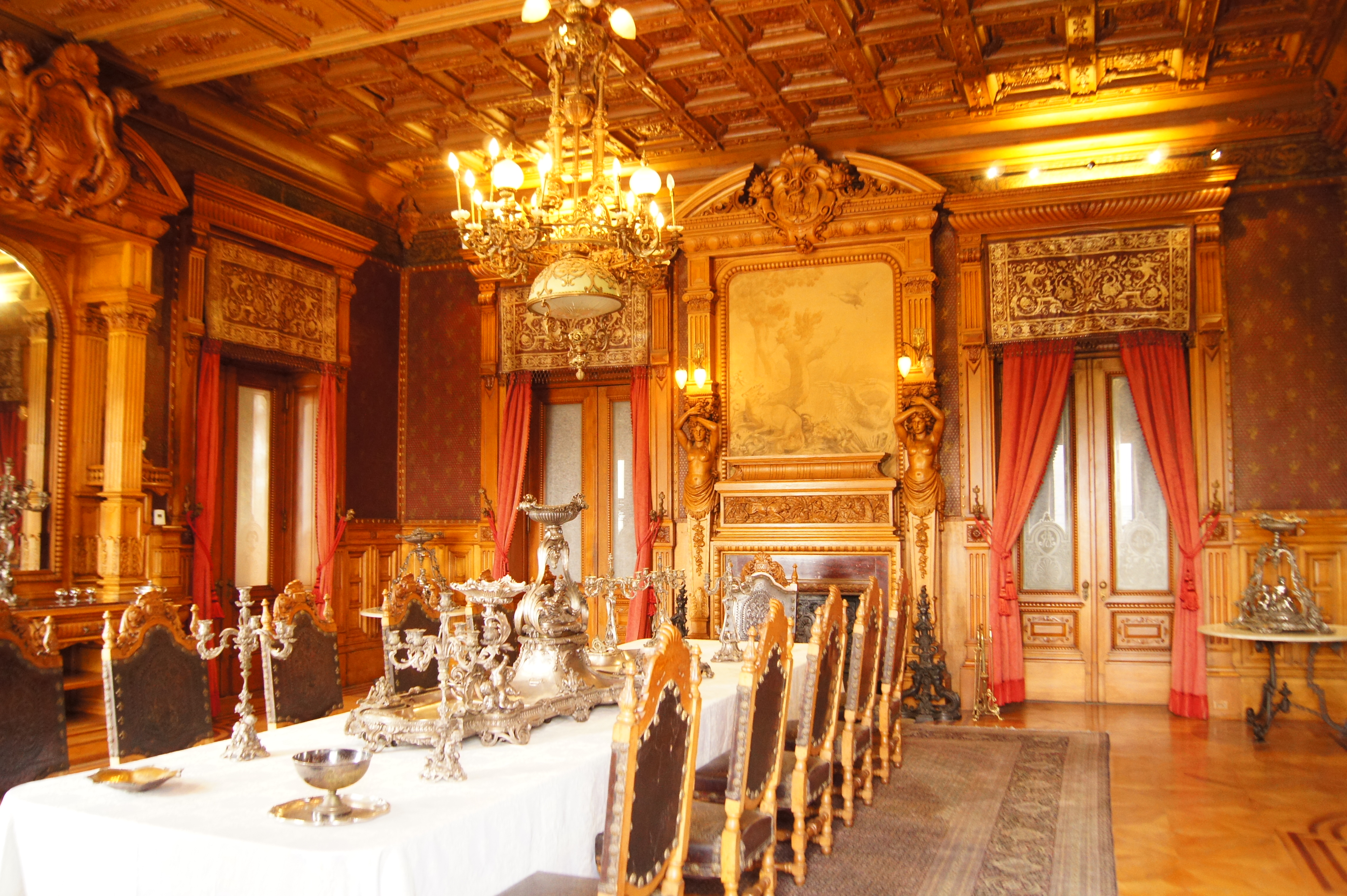
Dining room

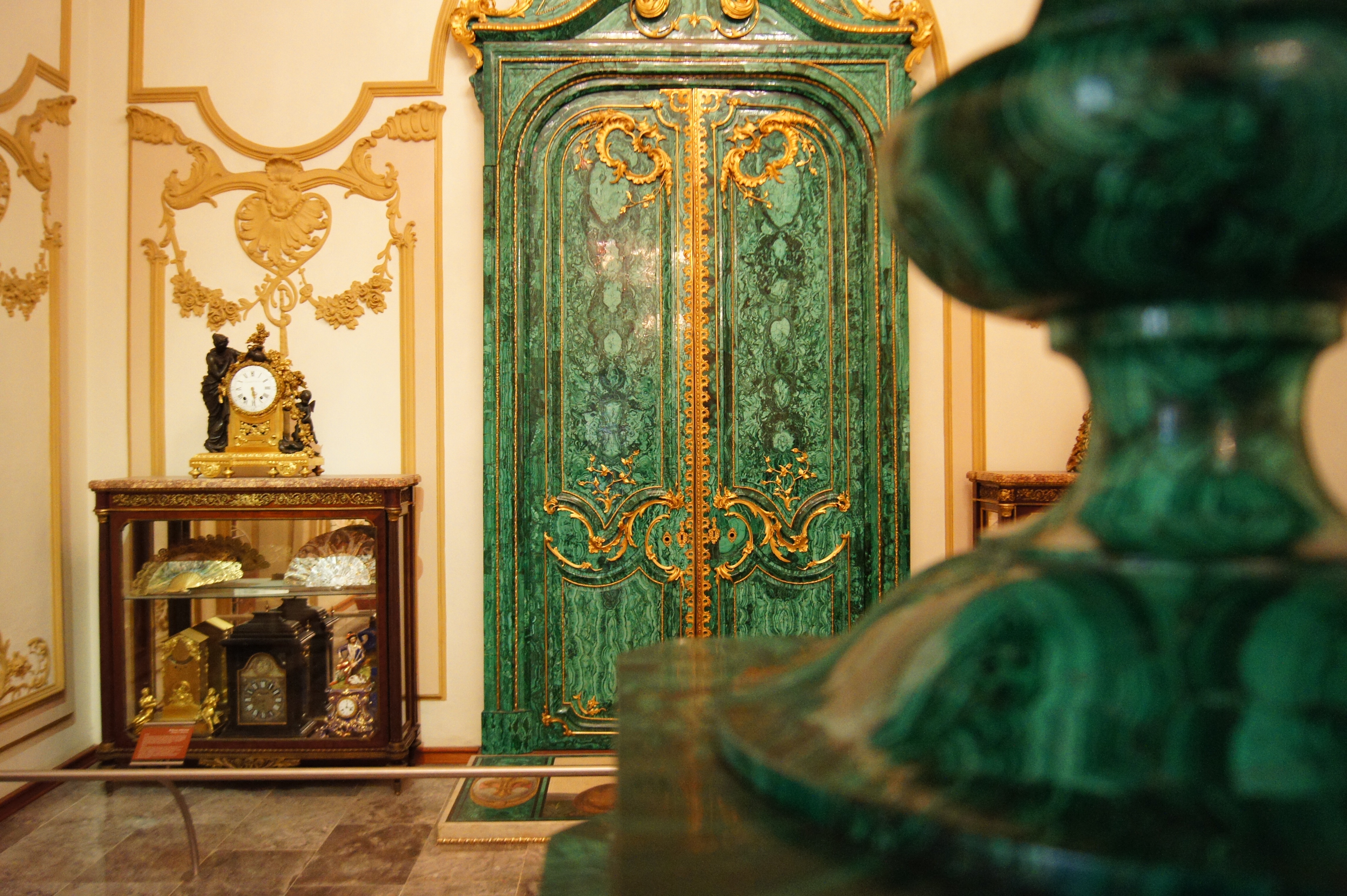
The Malachite Room

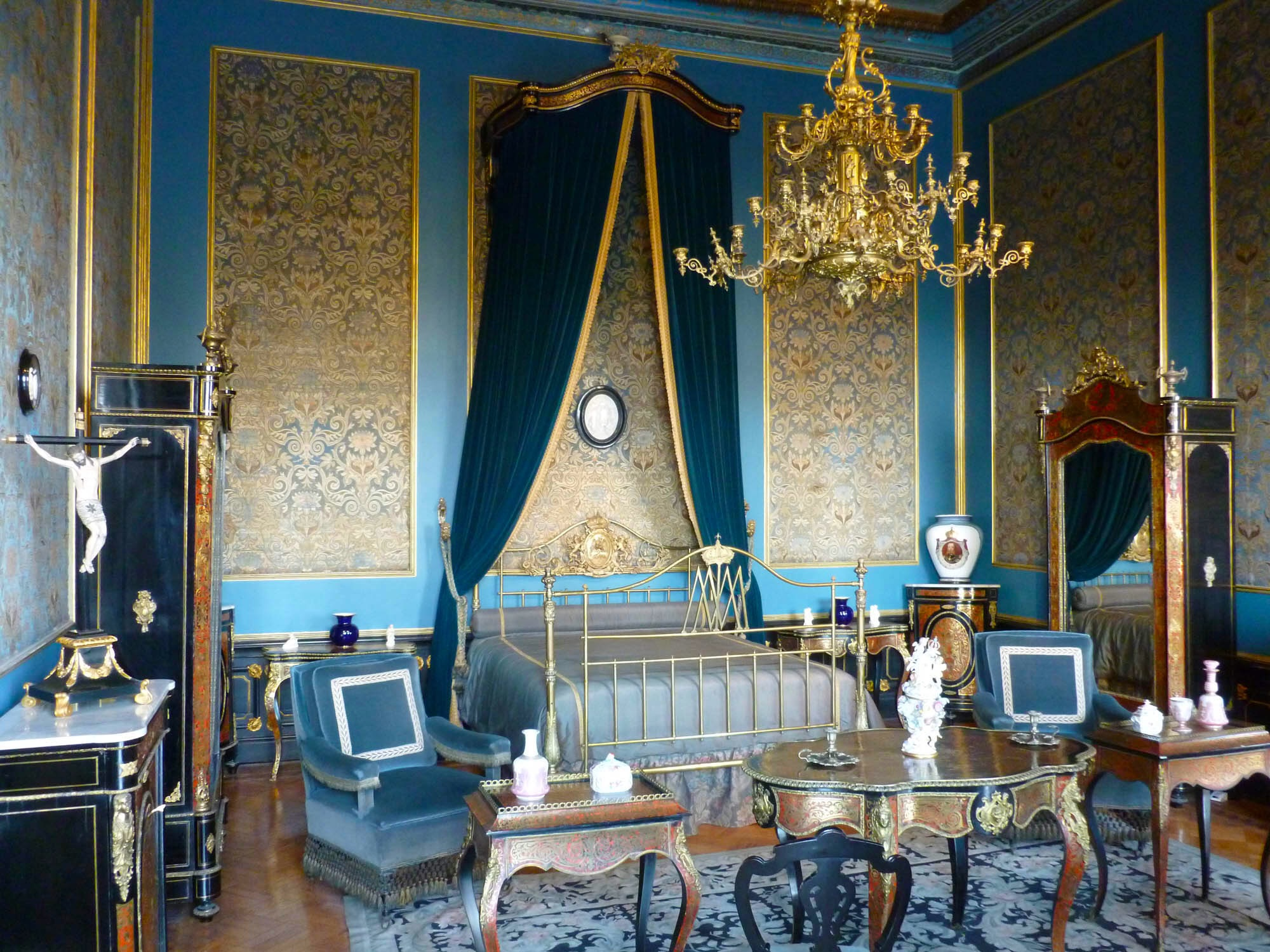
The bedroom of Empress Carlota of Mexico

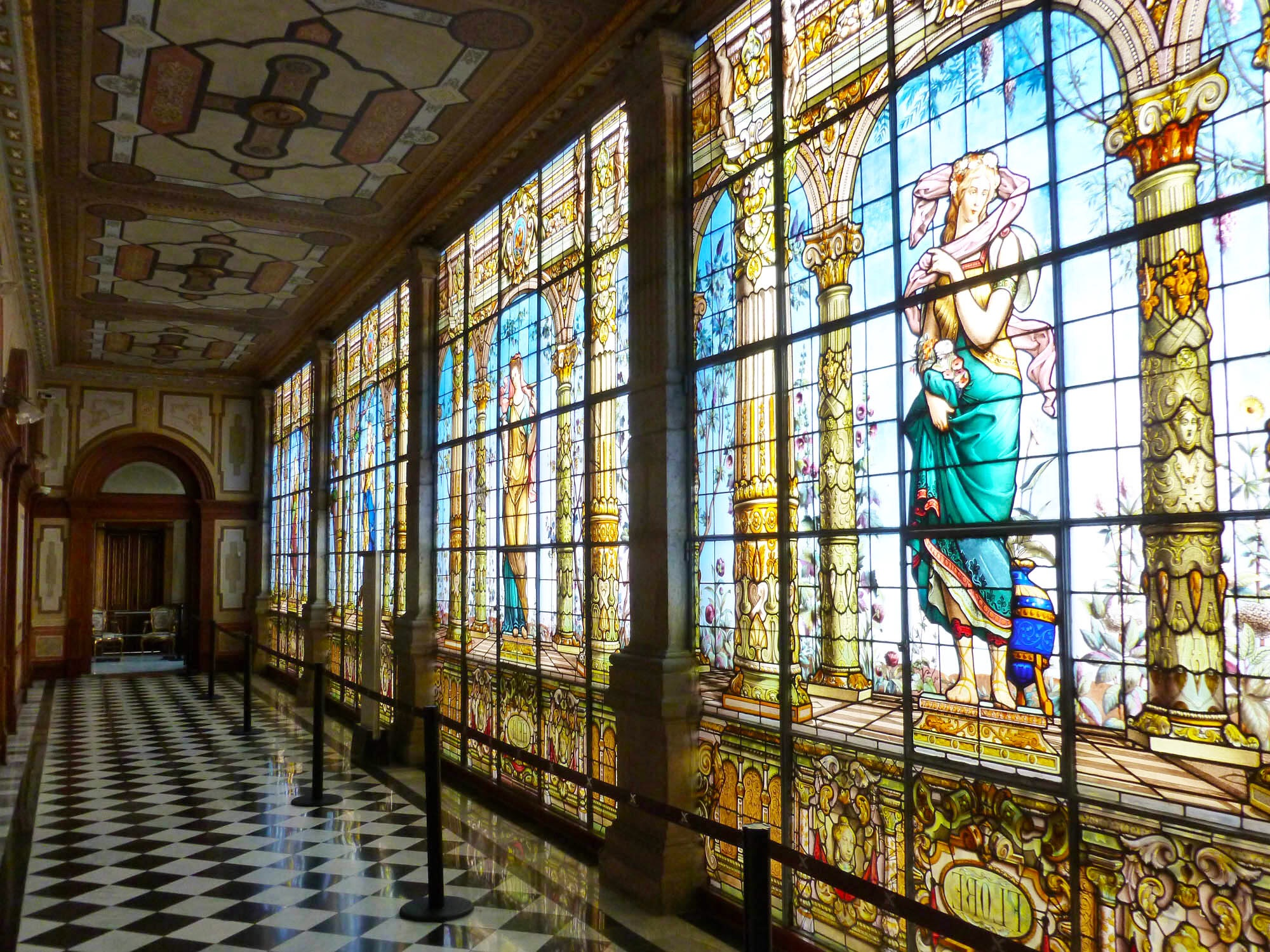
Stained glass windows along a hallway

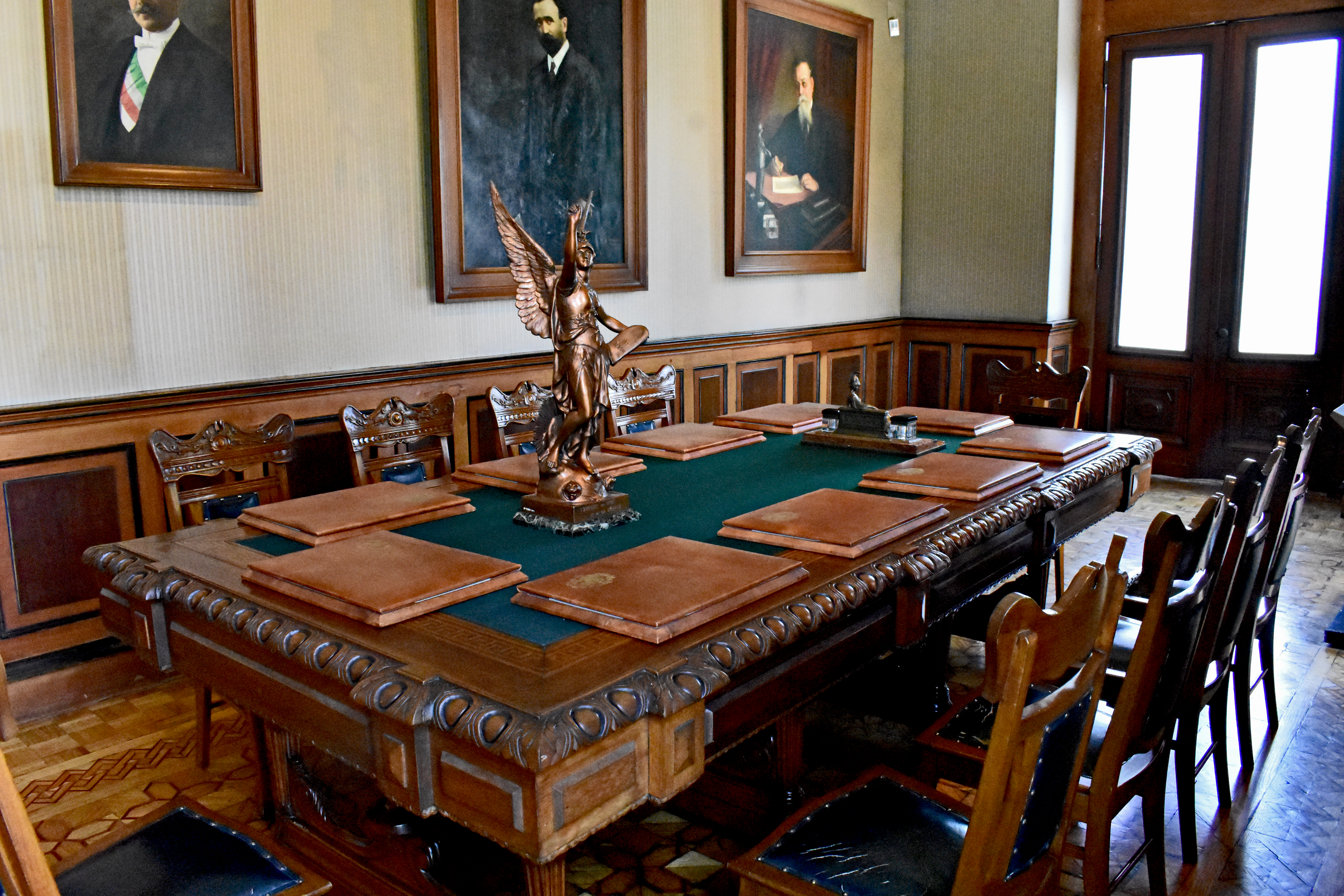
Cabinet room

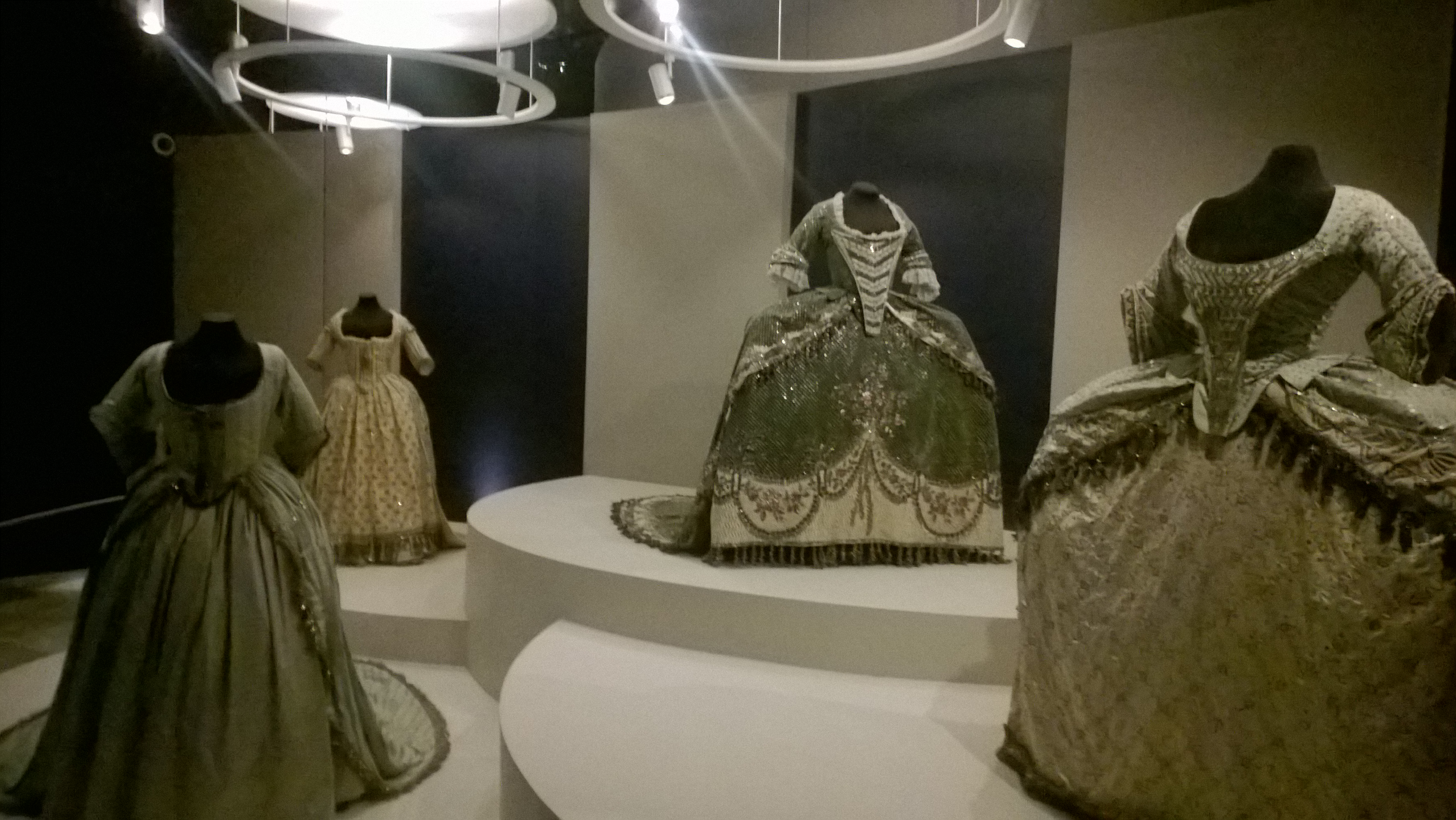
Museum exhibit of viceregal dresses

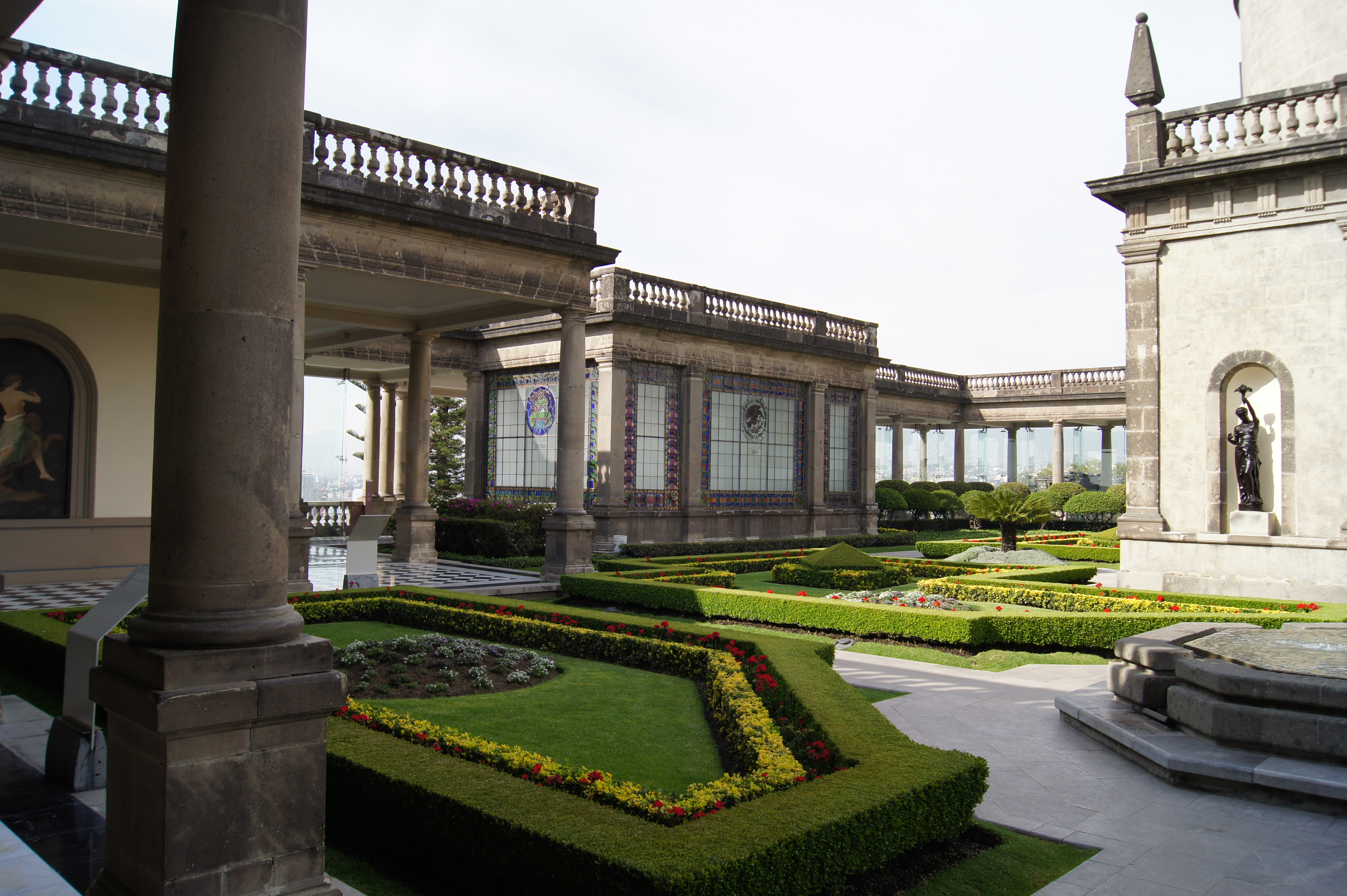
Castle gardens

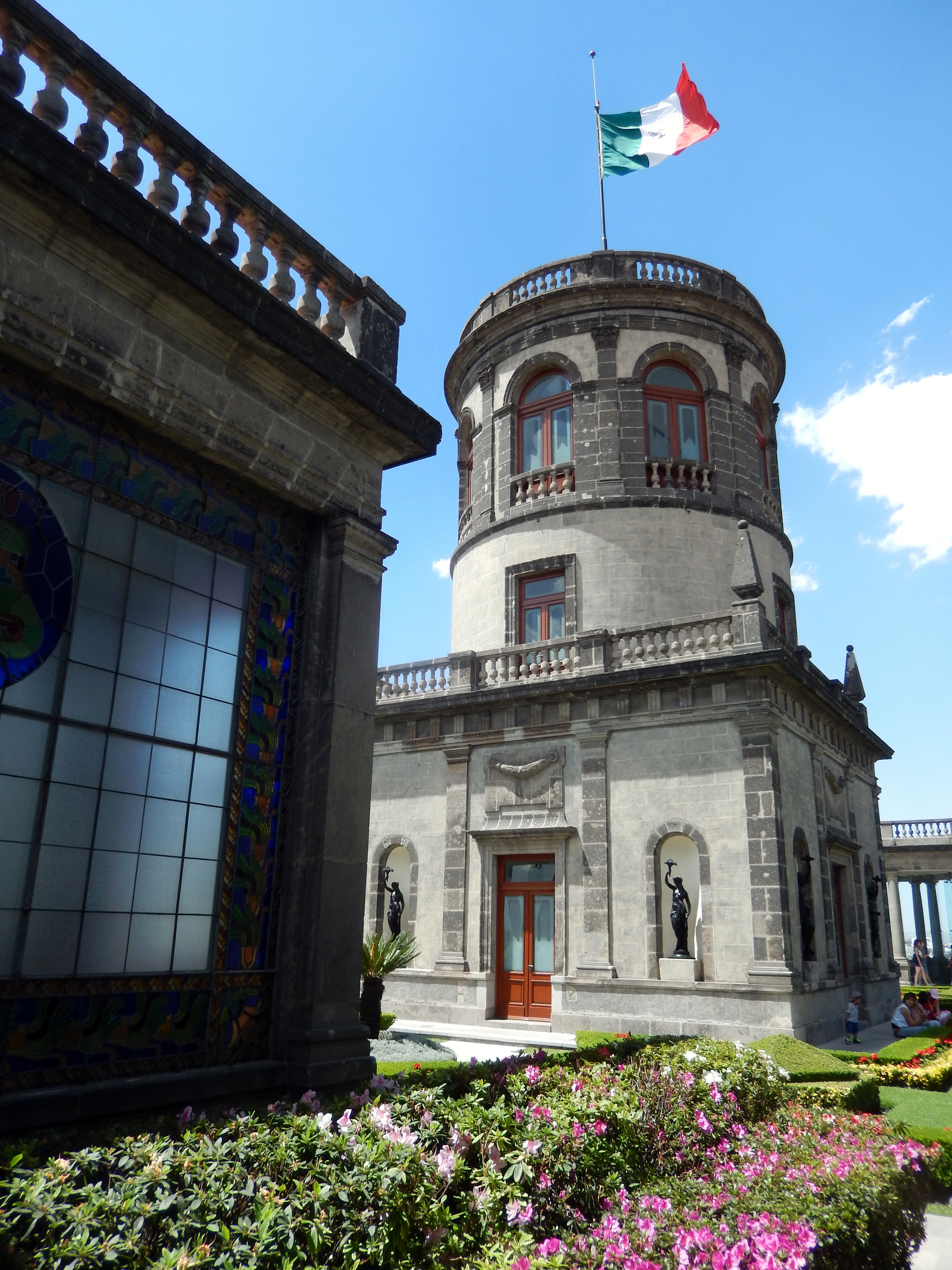
The Caballero Alto tower and observatory in the garden of the Alcázar

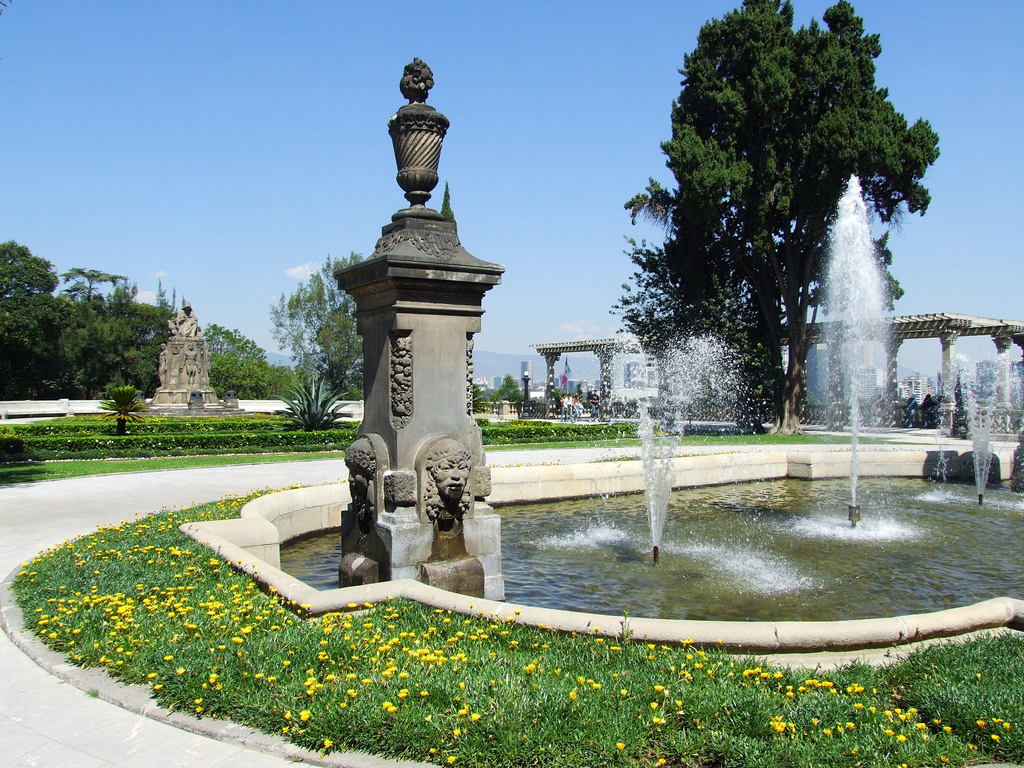
Castle grounds

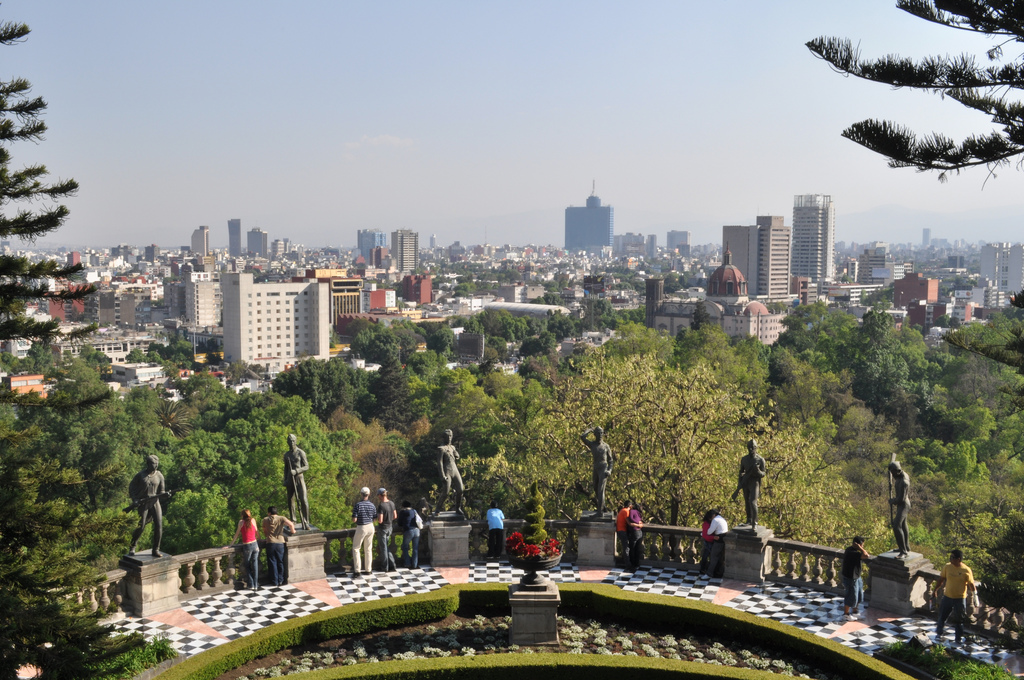
Statues of the Niños Héroes

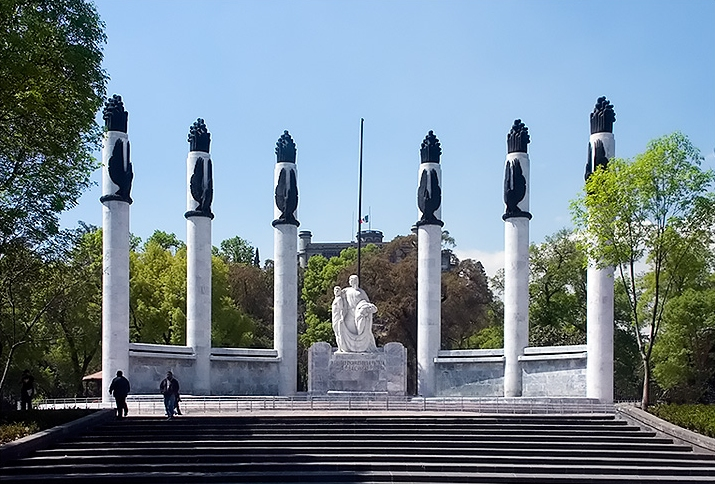
Monument to the Niños Héroes. Chapultepec Castle can be seen in the background

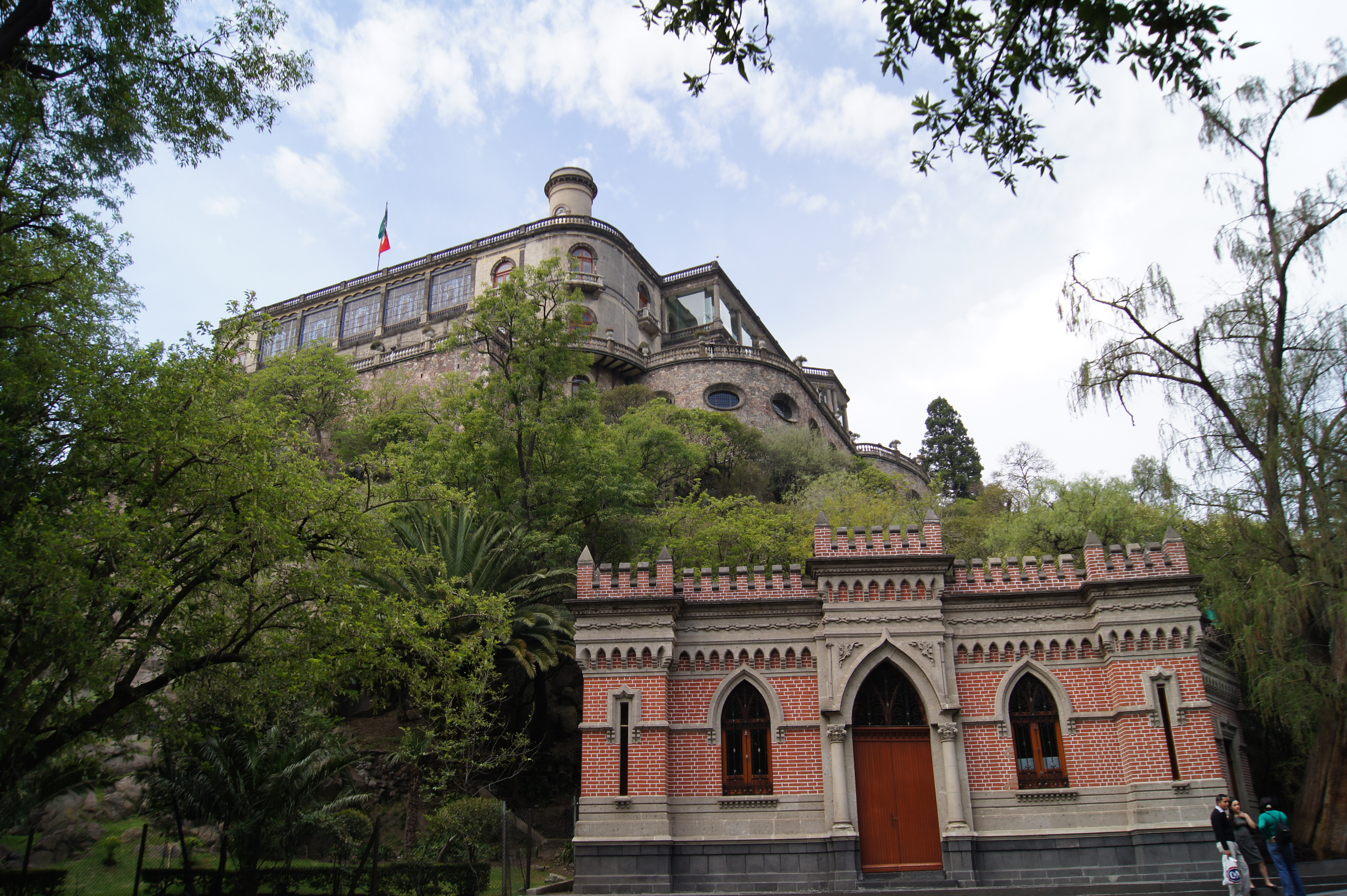
View of the Empress's Guard from the slopes of the hill of Chapultepec, in the woods of the same name

Historical paintings and drawings showing the castle

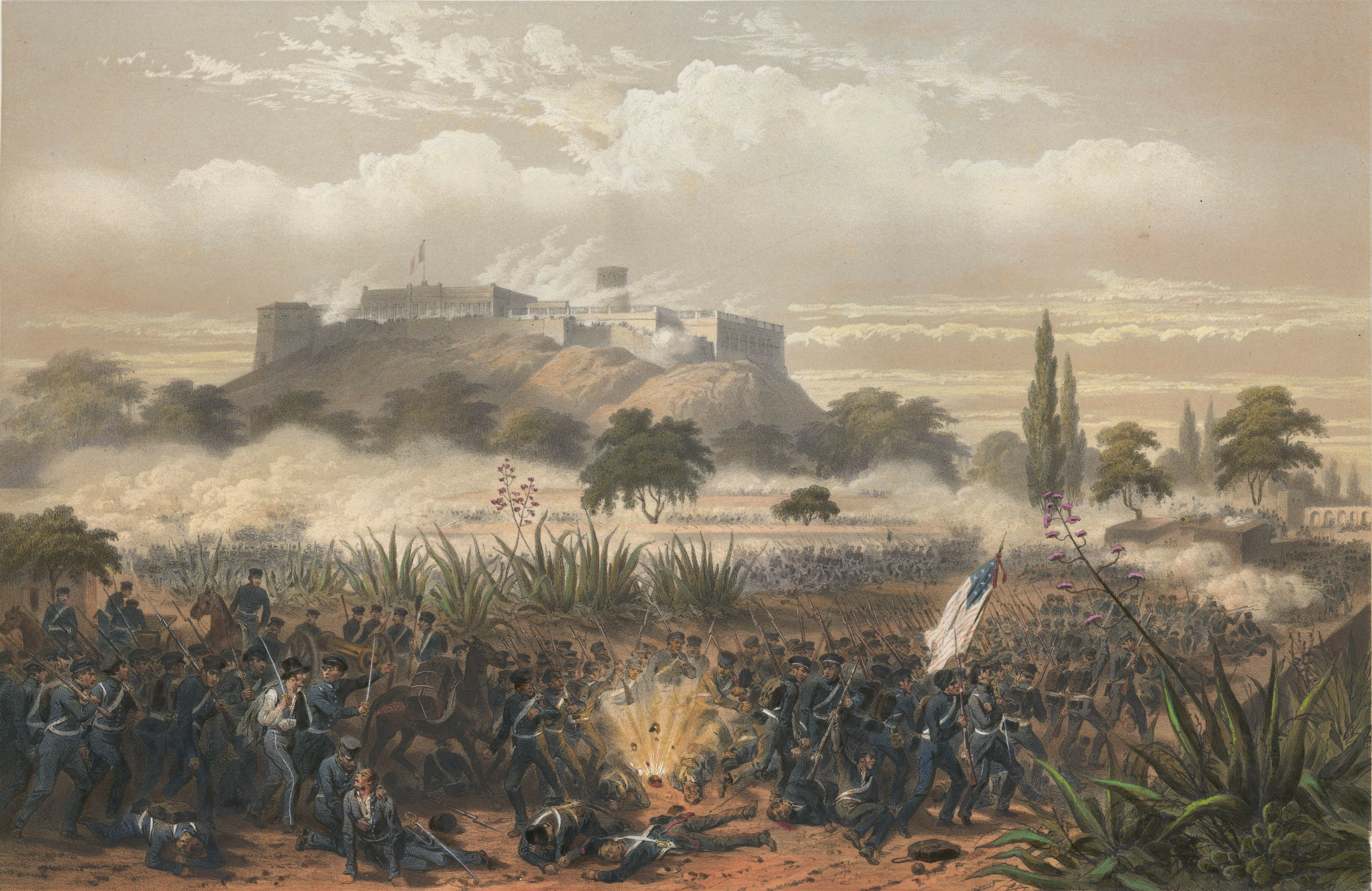
The American assault on the Chapultepec Castle, 1847 by Nebel and Bayot

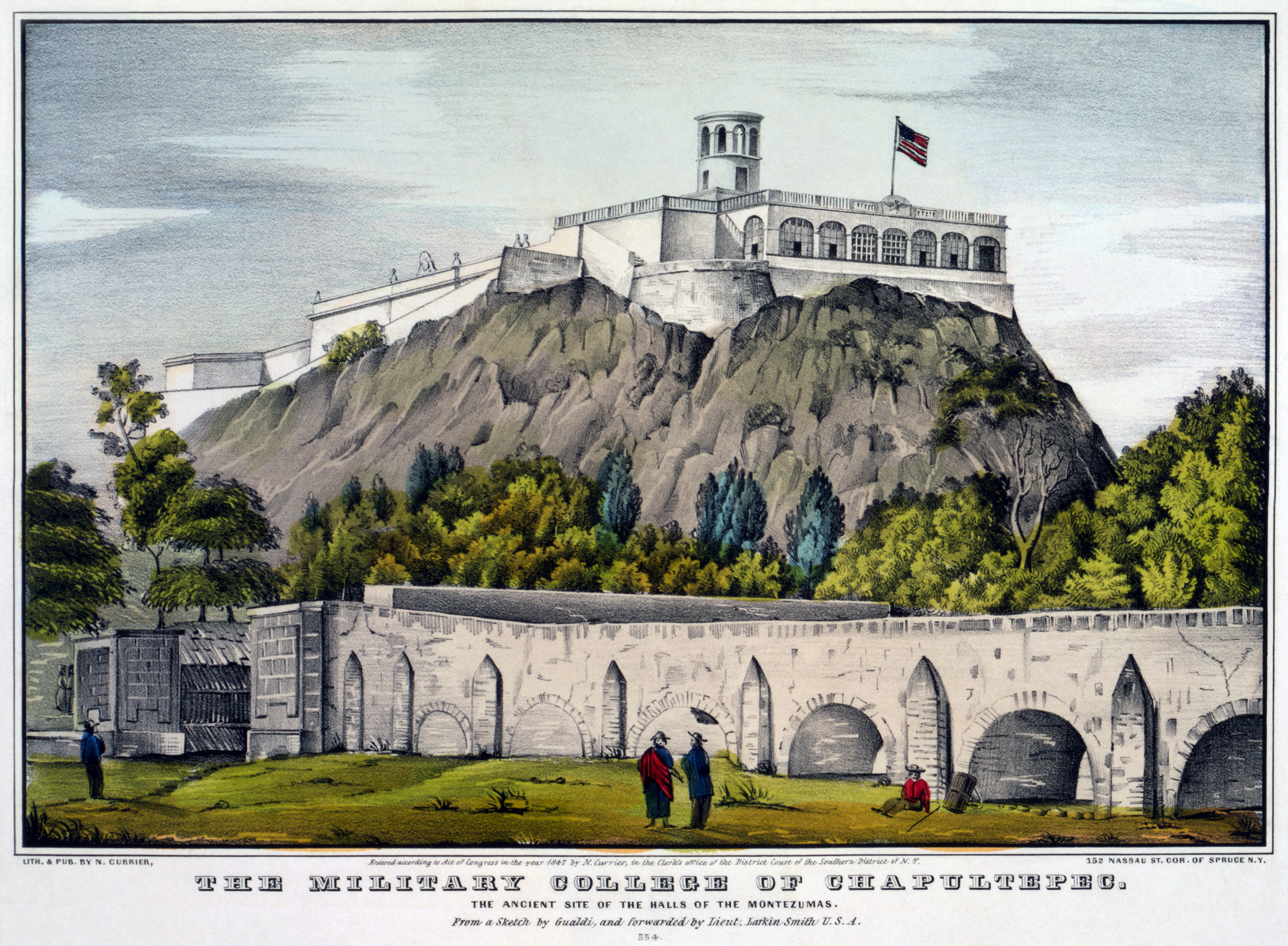
Chapultepec Castle following the Battle of Chapultepec

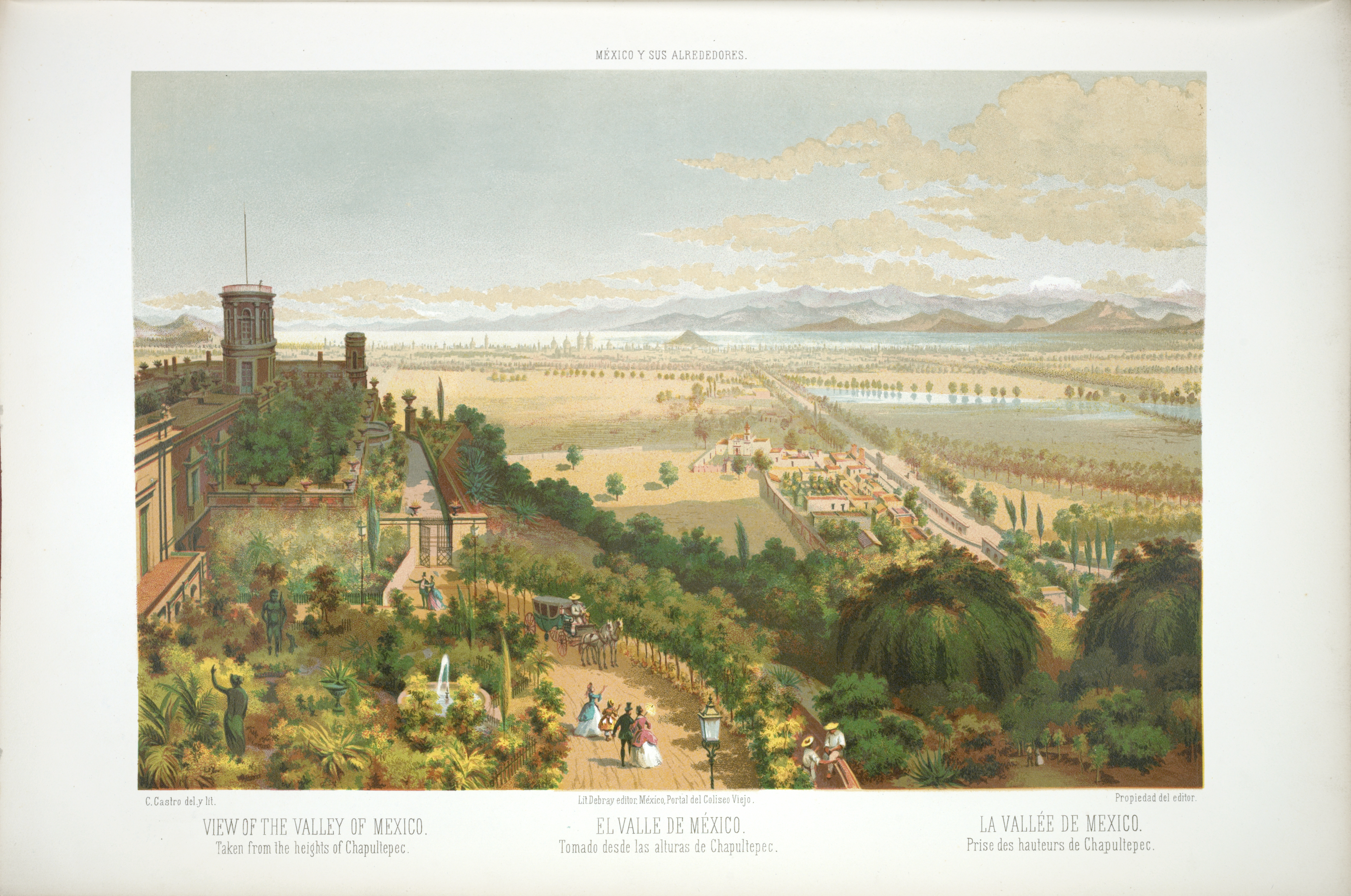
The Valley of Mexico from Chapultepec, painting of 1850 by Casimiro Castro. Museo Soumaya. during the Mexican-American War, ca. 1847 by Nathaniel Currier. Library of Congress.

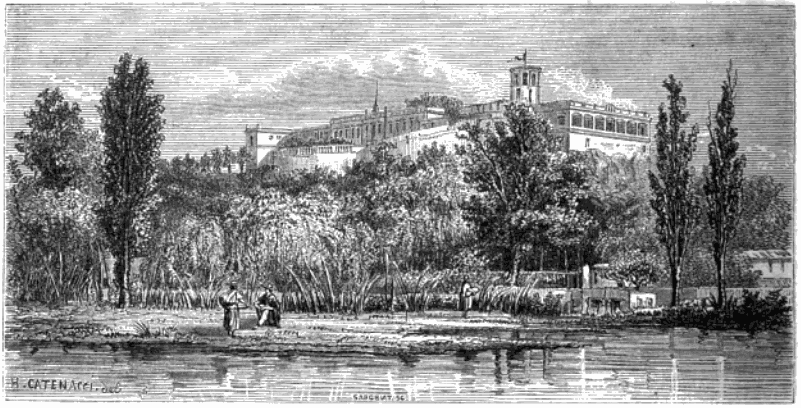
Chapultepec Castle just before the Second Mexican Empire, 1862

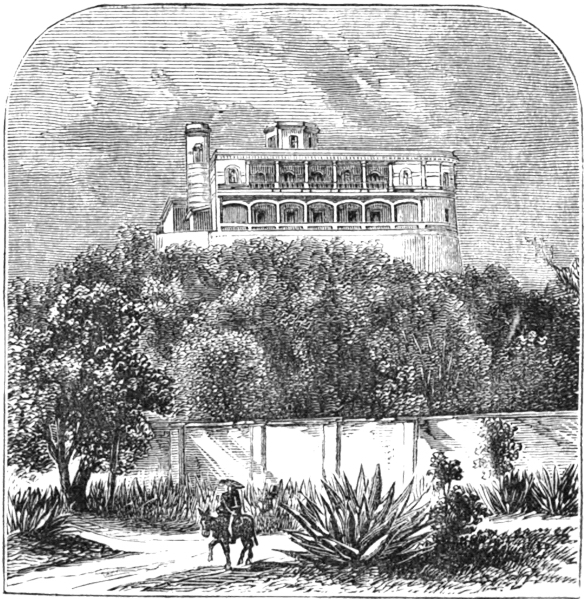
Chapultepec Castle in 1870 by Albert S. Evans.

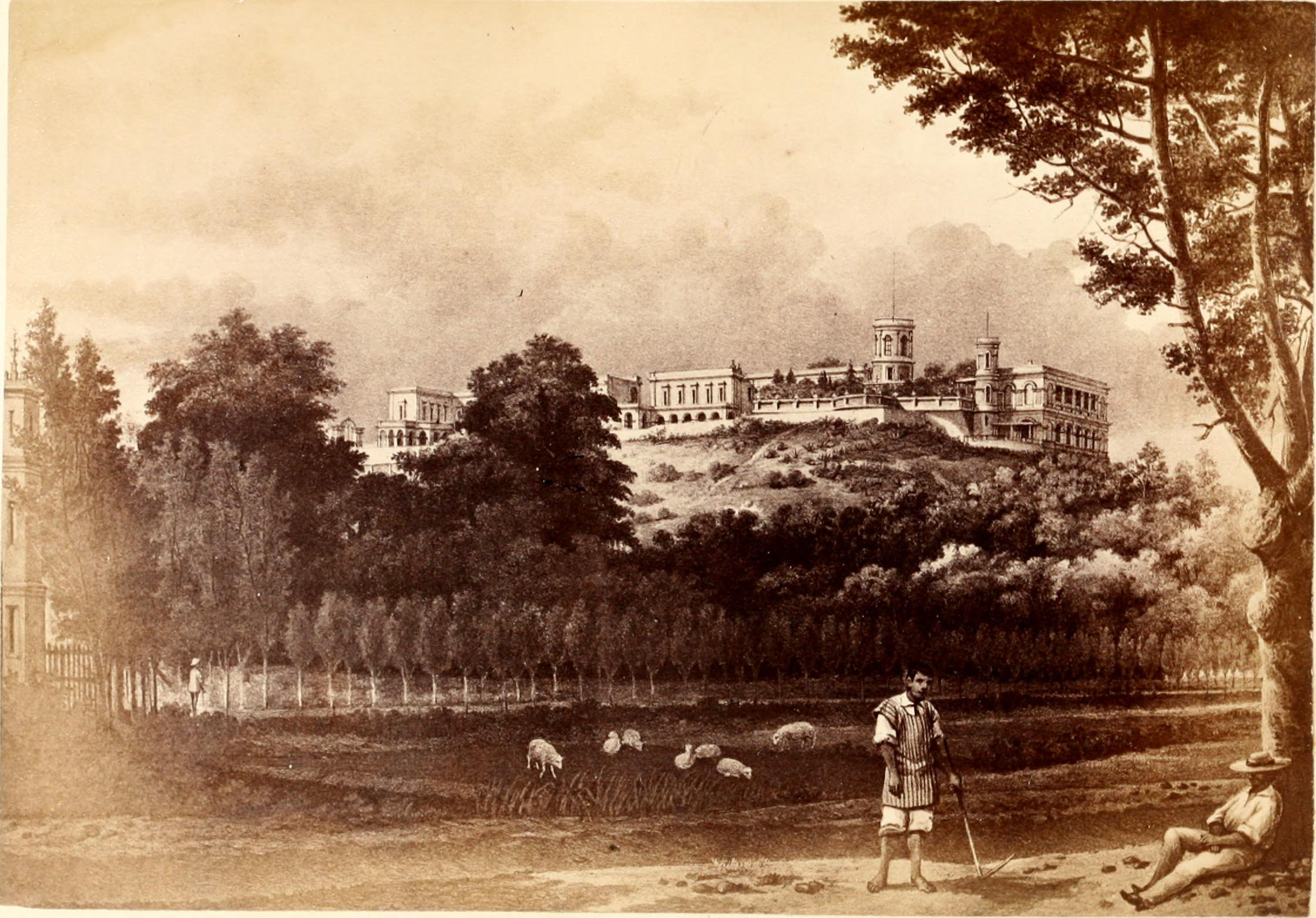
Chapultepec Castle in 1880 by Henry Becher. University of California Libraries.

== See also ==
- Miramare Castle
- Palace of Iturbide
- List of castles
