= Liechtenstein Castle (Maria Enzersdorf) =

Castle in Lower Austria

Coordinates: 48°05′33″N 16°16′12″E

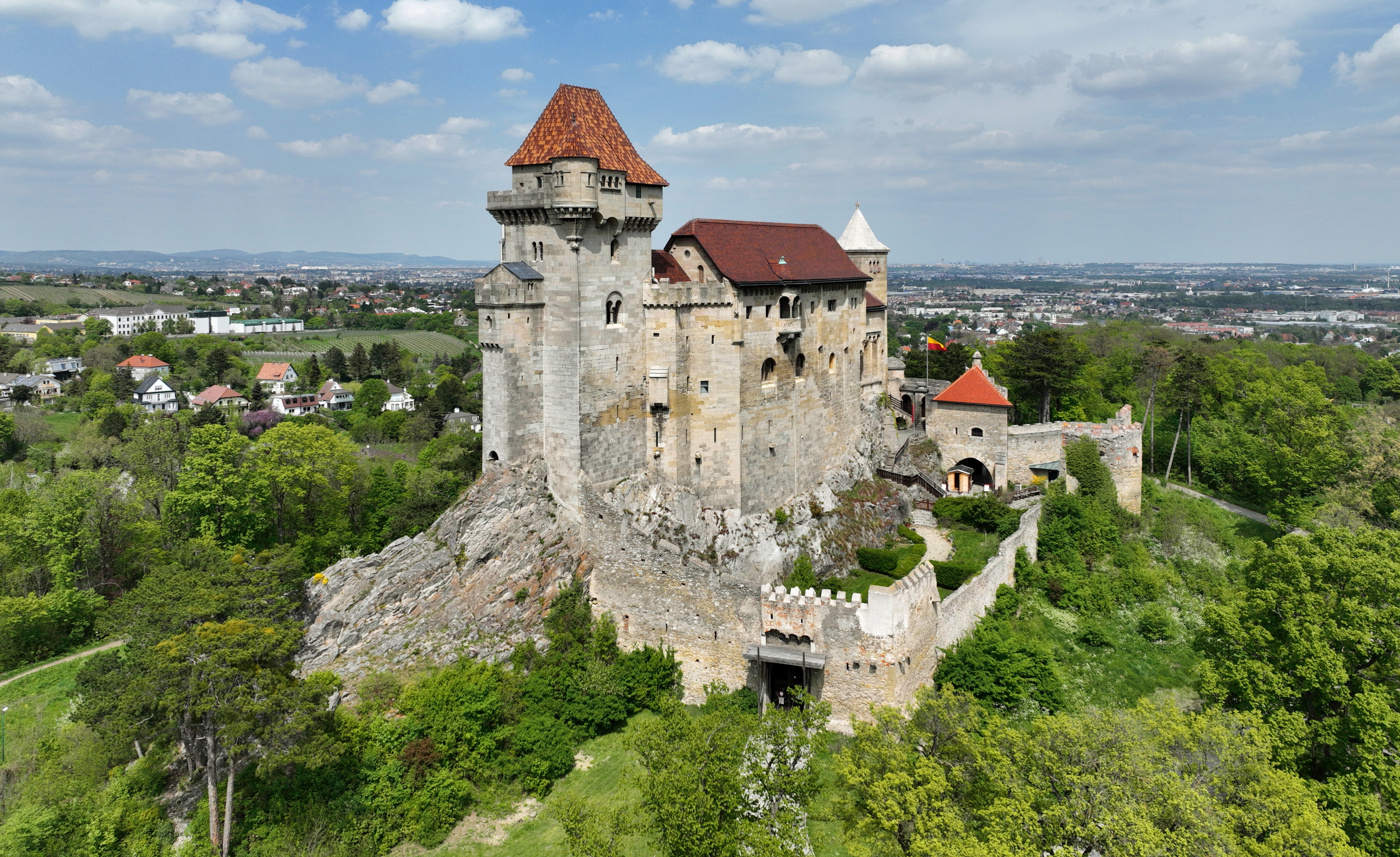
Liechtenstein Castle in Lower Austria

Liechtenstein Castle (German: Burg Liechtenstein) is a castle near Maria Enzersdorf in Lower Austria, bordering Vienna. It is on the edge of the Wienerwald (Vienna Woods). Liechtenstein (German for "bright stone") Castle is the eponymous ancestral seat and place of origin of the House of Liechtenstein, the ruling family of the Principality of Liechtenstein. The family owned the castle from the middle of the 12th century until the 13th century, and again from 1808 to the present.

== History ==
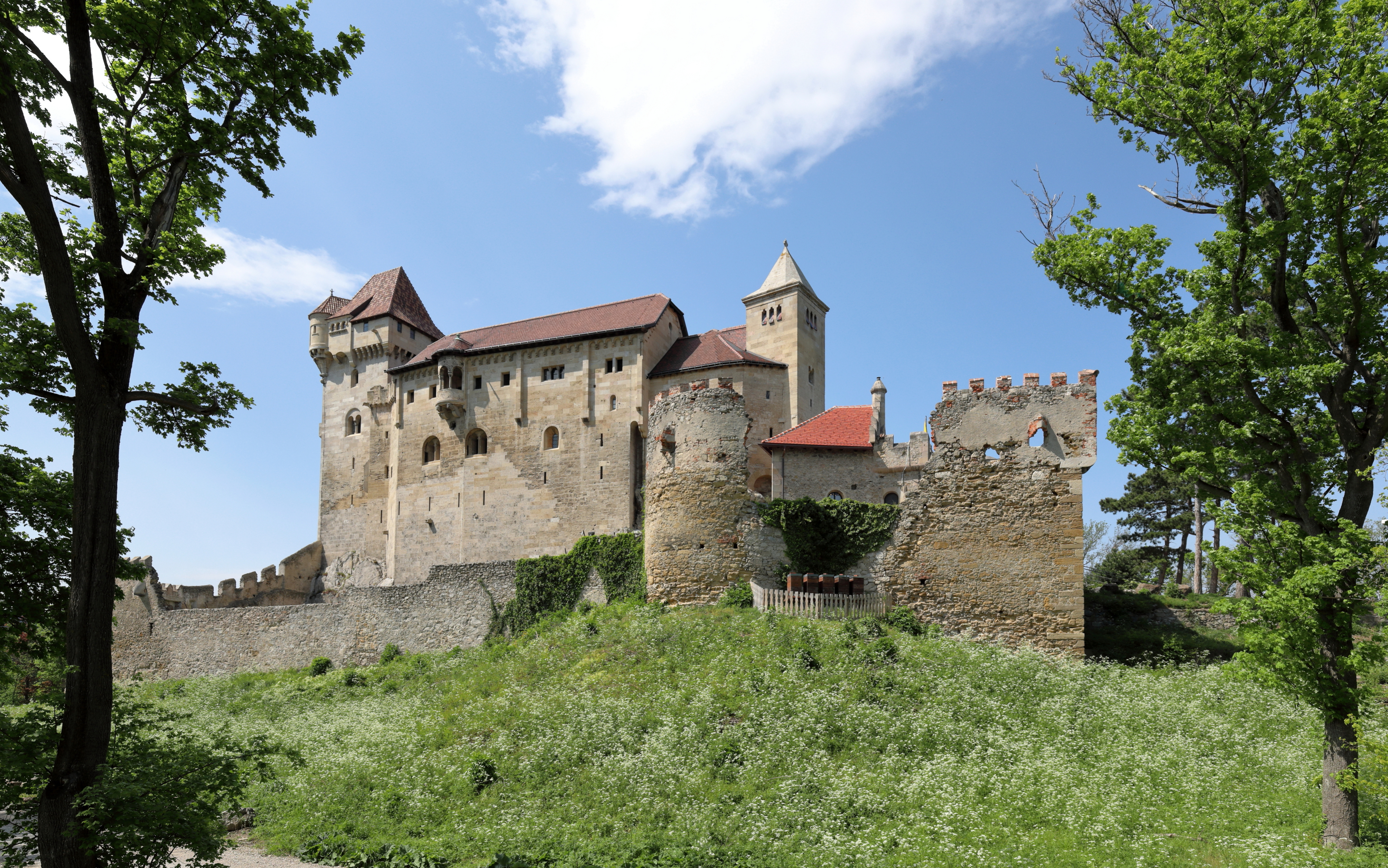
Southeast view

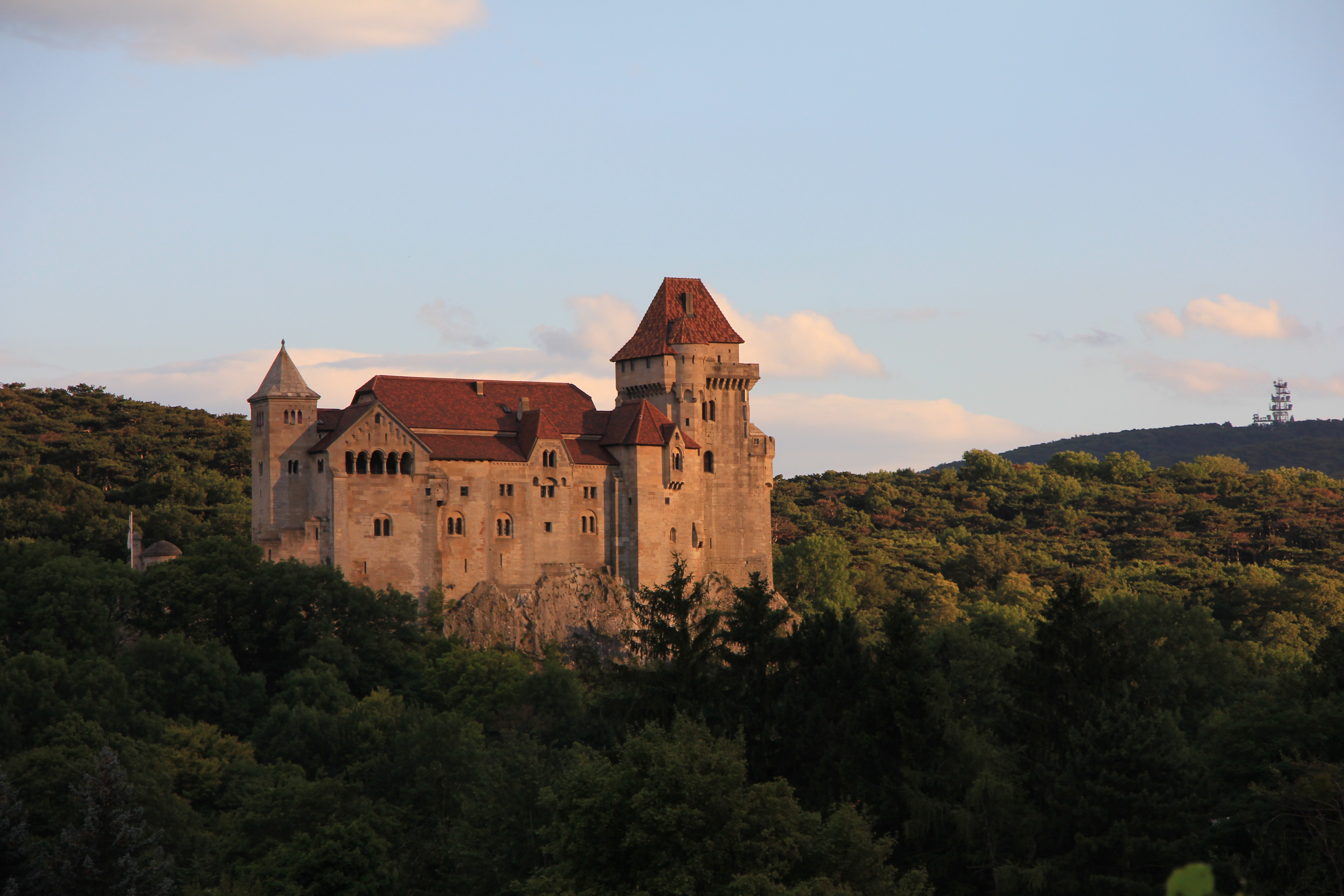
North view

The progenitor Hugo von Liechtenstein (d. 1156) built Liechtenstein Castle around 1122–36 on a fief that he received from the Babenberg margraves of Austria. He had also received the fiefs and tower houses of Leesdorf and Weikersdorf about 10 km south of it near Baden. Originally he had come to Austria in the knightly entourage of Diepold III, Margrave of Vohburg. The latter gave him Petronell-Carnuntum on the Danube as a fief, near the then border with the Kingdom of Hungary, where he built a castle near the old Roman settlement. These lands extended to Rohrau Castle. Petronell and Rohrau, which became his own property (allod) in 1142 from feudal property, remained important Liechtenstein seats in the High Middle Ages.

Liechtenstein castle originally started with a tower, but probably immediately expanded into a larger palace complex during the 12th century. It came into the Stadeck family as a result of the marriage of Dietmut of Liechtenstein (died 1308) to Leutold of Stadeck (died 1295). Since Albert IV, Duke of Austria, the castle has been pledged to various families. It was destroyed by the Ottomans in the siege of Vienna in 1529, and again in the Battle of Vienna in 1683.

In 1808, Johann I Joseph, Prince of Liechtenstein, bought back his ancestral seat. In the years 1820 to 1821 he built Schloss Liechtenstein below the castle, which is now used as a retirement home. In the years that followed, he had the landscape park around the ruins designed as a romantic landscape garden and built several artificial ruins. Between 1808 and 1816 the first restoration measures were carried out by the architect Joseph Hardtmuth. However, the castle remained in ruins until 1884, when it was rebuilt by architect Carl Gangolf Kayser for Johann II.

Today, the castle hosts the Nestroy Theatre Festival, which is held annually during the summer months. The 1969 film A Walk with Love and Death, the 1971 film The Vampire Happening, the 1979 film The Fifth Musketeer, and the 1993 film The Three Musketeers featured shots of the castle. In 2008 and 2009 it was renovated and given a new roof. The castle has been open to the public again since spring 2010. Guided tours take place daily.

== See also ==
- Lednice–Valtice Cultural Landscape
- Vaduz Castle in Liechtenstein – the official residence of the Princely Family of Liechtenstein
