= James Frederic Elton =

English explorer (1840–1877)

James Frederic Elton (3 August 1840 – 19 December 1877) was an English explorer in Africa.

== Life ==
Born 3 August 1840, he was the second son of Lieutenant-colonel Roberts W. Elton of the 59th Regiment, Bengal Army, and grandson of Jacob Elton of Dedham, Essex.

When the Indian Mutiny broke out in 1857, Elton entered the Bengal army and saw much active service. Having been with the relieving armies at Delhi and Lucknow he was placed on the staff of the commander-in-chief. Sir Hugh Rose (Lord Strathnairn), to whom he was aide-de-camp for some years. His services obtained for him the Indian medal with two clasps.

In 1860, Elton volunteered for service in China, and was present at the taking of Peking and other engagements, receiving the China Medal after the campaign. Soon after gaining his captaincy (98th Regiment), he left the British service, and in 1866, joined the staff of the French army in Mexico during the reign of the Emperor Maximilian. On his return to England at the conclusion of the war, he published a graphic account of his adventures, entitled With the French in Mexico, 8vo, London, 1867.

In 1868, Elton went to Natal, and occupied himself in travelling about the colony until 1870, when he undertook a long journey of exploration from the Tati gold district down to the mouth of the Limpopo, his narrative of which, accompanied by an excellent map, was published in volume xlii. of the Journal of the Royal Geographical Society.

In 1871, Elton was sent to make reports on the gold and diamond fields, and was also employed on a diplomatic mission to settle differences with the Portuguese authorities. In 1872, he was appointed government agent on the Zulu frontier. After some months, he returned to Natal to recover from an attack of fever caused. While at Natal, he acted as protector of the immigrant native labourers, and became a member of the executive and legislative councils.

Wishing to be active, in 1873 Elton left Natal with various missions: one of which was to treat with the governor-general of Mozambique and the sultan of Zanzibar, regarding the laying down of a telegraph cable from Aden; a second, to inquire into the emigration of native labour from Delagoa Bay and to confer with the governor-general of Mozambique; and the third, to meet Sir Bartle Frere at Zanzibar, and assist in considering the slave-trade question.

During the same year (1873), Elton was appointed by Sir Bartle Frere assistant political agent and vice-consul at Zanzibar, with a view to assist Dr. John Kirk in the suppression of the East African slave-trade. While occupying this post he made an interesting journey along the coast country between Dar-es-Salaam and Quiloa, or Kilwa, an account of which, enriched with observations on the products of the country, was published, with a map supplied by him, in volume xliv. of the Journal of the Royal Geographical Society.

In March 1875, Elton was promoted to the office of British consul in Portuguese territory, with residence at Mozambique. He was here engaged in many expeditions for the suppression of the slave-trade from this and other parts of the east coast, in the course of which he made numerous journeys by sea and land, to the south as far as Delagoa Bay, and over the Indian Ocean to the Seychelle Islands and Madagascar.

Early in 1877, he started from Mozambique on an expedition to the west and north-west, into the heart of the Makua country, returning to the coast at Mwendazi or Memba Bay; thence he went northward, a journey of four hundred and fifty miles on foot, through the curious craggy peaks of Sorisa, and up the Iurio, to the Sugarloaf Hills and the cataracts of Pomba, descending again to Ibo. Elton spoke very positively of the Makua people, describing them as "kind", "intelligent", "decent", "trustworthy" and "very respectable." He also wrote that he was worried they were vulnerable from attacks by Arab slave traders who were connected to the Indian Ocean slave trade. Elton wrote that he believed the British Empire should use its military might to combat the Arab slave traders in the region. Elton also visited all the Quirimbas Islands, and explored the coast up to the limit of the Zanzibar mainland territory, beyond the Bay of Tongue, which occupied him three months. In July of the same year Elton left Mozambique for the Zambezi and the Shiré rivers, his intention being to visit the British mission stations on Lake Nyassa, explore the lake and surrounding country, visit various chiefs connected with the slave-trade, and ascertain the possibility of a route from the north end of the lake to Quiloa, at which seaport he proposed to embark in a steamer for Zanzibar, hoping to reach the latter place in November or early in December.

His mission to the chiefs and the circumnavigation of the lake were successfully accomplished, but with the land journey troubles began; "the country was devastated by wars among the different tribes, porterage and food wore often unobtainable, and instead of taking a direct route to the east Elton was compelled to travel by a very circuitous one to the north". He struggled on "full of hope", energetic to the last until within a few miles of the town of Usekhe in Ugogo, on the caravan-route between the coast opposite Zanzibar and Unyanyembe, when he sank from malarious fever, brought on by exposure and privation. He died 19 December 1877, aged 37, and was buried about two miles from his last camp, under a large baobab tree which overlooks the plains of Usekhe. His four companions, Mesrs. Cotterill, Rhodes, Hoste, and Downie, marked the spot by a large wooden cross, and carved his initials on the tree which overshadows his grave.

== Works ==
His journals were edited and completed by H. B. Cotterill under the title of Travels and Researches among the Lakes and Mountains of Eastern and Central Africa.... With maps and illustrations [and a preface, by Horace Waller, containing a brief memoir of J. F. Elton], London, 1879. A portrait accompanies the work.
