= Mexican Mint =

National mint of Mexico

Coordinates: 19°25′43″N 99°9′57″W

Agency overview
- Formed: 11 May 1535; 491 years ago
- Jurisdiction: Federal government of Mexico
- Headquarters: Mexico City
- Employees: 1,845 (2006)
- Agency executive: Director
- Parent agency: Secretariat of Finance and Public Credit
- Website: www.cmm.gob.mx

The Casa de Moneda de México is the national mint of Mexico and is the oldest mint in the Americas.

== History ==
The Casa de Moneda was established on 11 May 1535 by the Spanish viceroy Antonio de Mendoza by a decree from the Spanish Crown to create the first mint in the Americas. It was built on top of Moctezuma's Casa Denegrida, the black house where the last emperor of the Aztecs used to meditate, and which was part of the Casas Nuevas de Moctezuma.

The mint's silver eight-real coins and its successor coin, the silver peso, circulated widely in the Americas and Asia well into the 19th century and became the basis of the modern national currencies of many countries in these parts of the world, including the United States dollar, the Japanese yen and the Chinese yuan.

Since 1983, coins are only produced in San Luis Potosí. The ancient headquarters are currently the Museo Nacional de las Culturas in Mexico City. The mint's main client is the Bank of Mexico. Since 13 January 2014, the general mint director is Guillermo Hopkins Gamez. He is also the vice-president of the Mint Directors Conference.

== See also ==
- Bullion
- Bullion coin
- Dos Pesos gold coin
- Gold as an investment
- Inflation hedge
- Mexican peso
- Silver as an investment
