= Casa Denegrida de Moctezuma =

Royal palace of Moctezuma II in Mexico City, Mexico

- Black House of Moctezuma
- Cultures: Aztec
- Location: Mexico City

Site notes
- Material: stone, basalt
- Excavation dates: 2008
- Archaeologists: Elsa Hernández Pons

The Casa Denegrida de Moctezuma (The Black House of Moctezuma) was part of the royal palace and chambers of Tenochtitlan's ninth tlatoani Moctezuma II. The Black House, or more accurately the black room, was a windowless room fully painted in black where Moctezuma would meditate. The floor was made of large irregular black basalt slabs.

== History ==
As soon as 1535, the Mexican Mint (Casa de Moneda de América Latina) was built on top of the remains of the Casa Denegrida. In 1850, minting operations stopped and the building became the Museo Nacional de las Culturas.

In November 2008, a group of archaeologists led by Elsa Hernández Pons working at 13 Moneda St. uncovered pieces of a wall and a basalt floor. The archaeologists believed it was the Casa Denegrida described by Spanish conquerors where Moctezuma II would meditate and practice shamanic rituals. It is believed that the Black House was where Moctezuma II saw the return of the Spaniards as the return of Quetzalcoatl.

== Related pages ==
- Casas Nuevas de Moctezuma
- Mexican Mint
- Museo Nacional de las Culturas
- Palace of Axayacatl
