= Tecpán =

Tecpán may refer to:

- Tecpán Guatemala, a municipality in the Guatemalan department of Chimaltenango
- Tecpan de Galeana, a city in the Mexican state of Guerrero
  - Tecpan de Galeana (municipality), its surrounding municipality
- Tecpan (architecture), a Nahuatl term for a palace
