= Palacio de Ocomo =

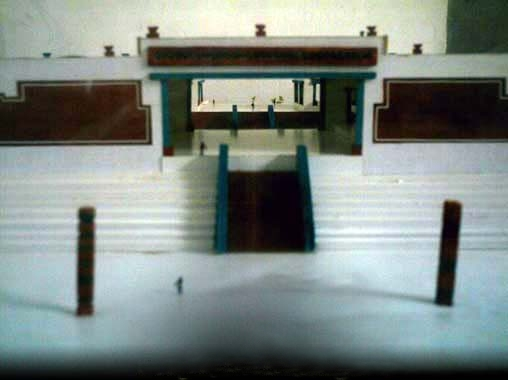
- Interactive map of Palacio de Ocomo
- Cultures: El Grillo tradition
- Location: Oconahua, Jalisco, Mexico
- Region: Jalisco

History
- Built: c. 600-700 CE

Site notes
- Architectural style: Teotihuacano
- Excavation dates: 2006-present
- Restored: April 3, 2006

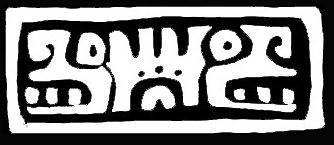

Palacio de Ocomo, known in English as the Ocomo Palace, is an archaeological zone located in Oconahua, Jalisco, Mexico, constructed between the year is 700 and the 1100 AD, and reconstructed several times even up to the time of the Spanish Conquest, when it was abandoned.

Ocomo Palace is one of the biggest tecpans (palaces) of the ancient Mexico, it has 125 meters for side, and it is considered the more monumental building of this style in Mexico, since measures 1000 square meters.
