= Casas Nuevas de Moctezuma =

Archaeological site in Mexico City

- New Houses of Moctezuma
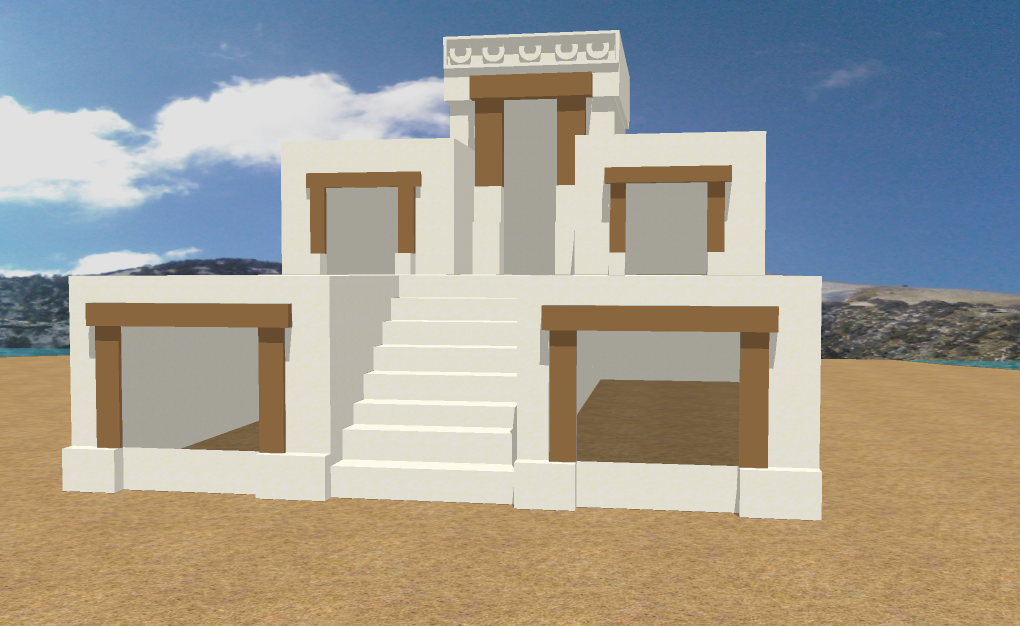
- Model of Moctezuma's palace, based on an illustration from the Codex Mendoza (1542).
- Cultures: Aztec
- Location: Valley of Mexico

Site notes
- Material: stone, basalt
- Excavation dates: 2008
- Archaeologists: Elsa Hernández Pons, Colette Taurillo

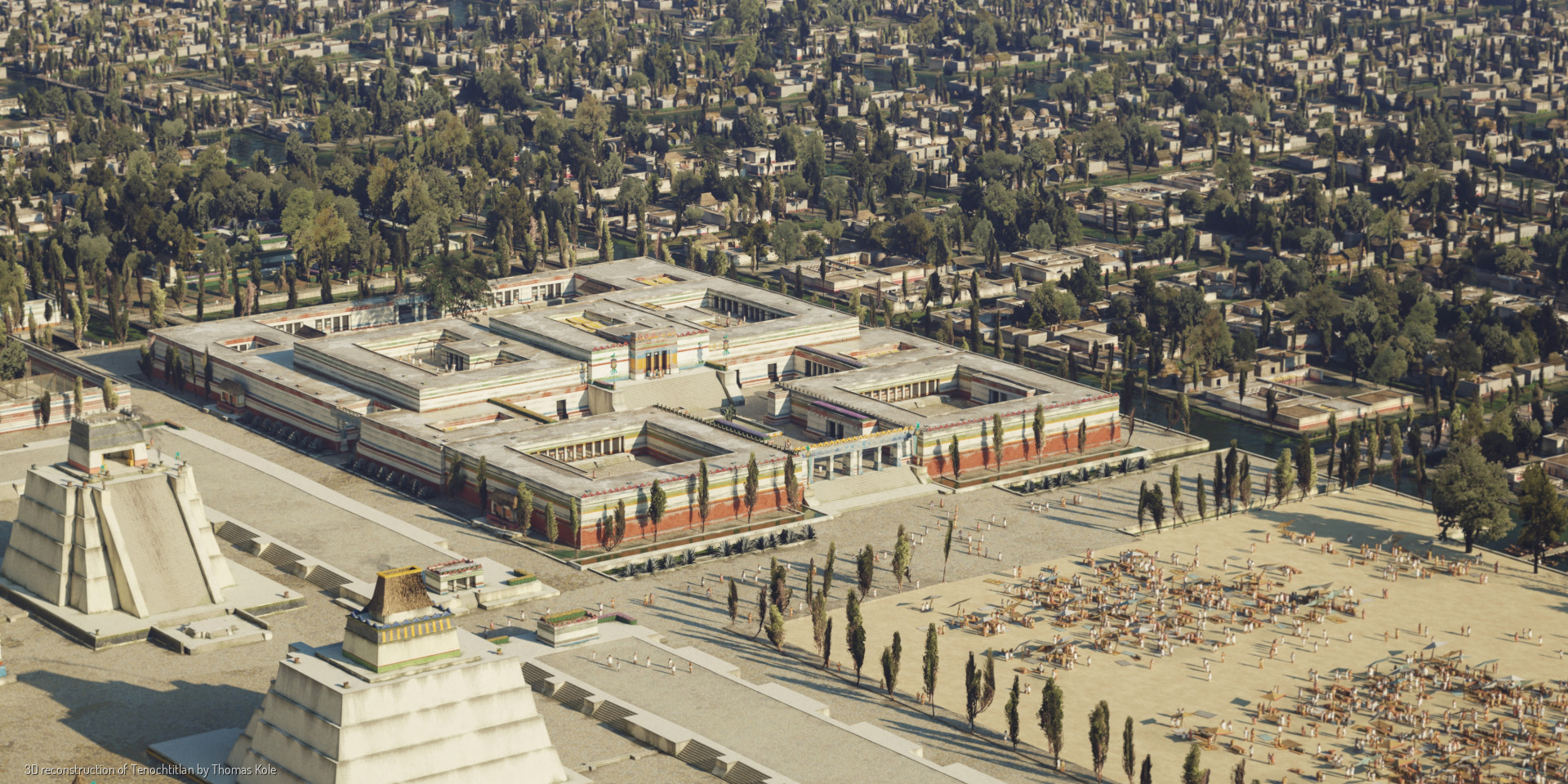
Reconstruction of Moctezuma's Palace in Portrait of Tenochtitlan by Thomas Kole

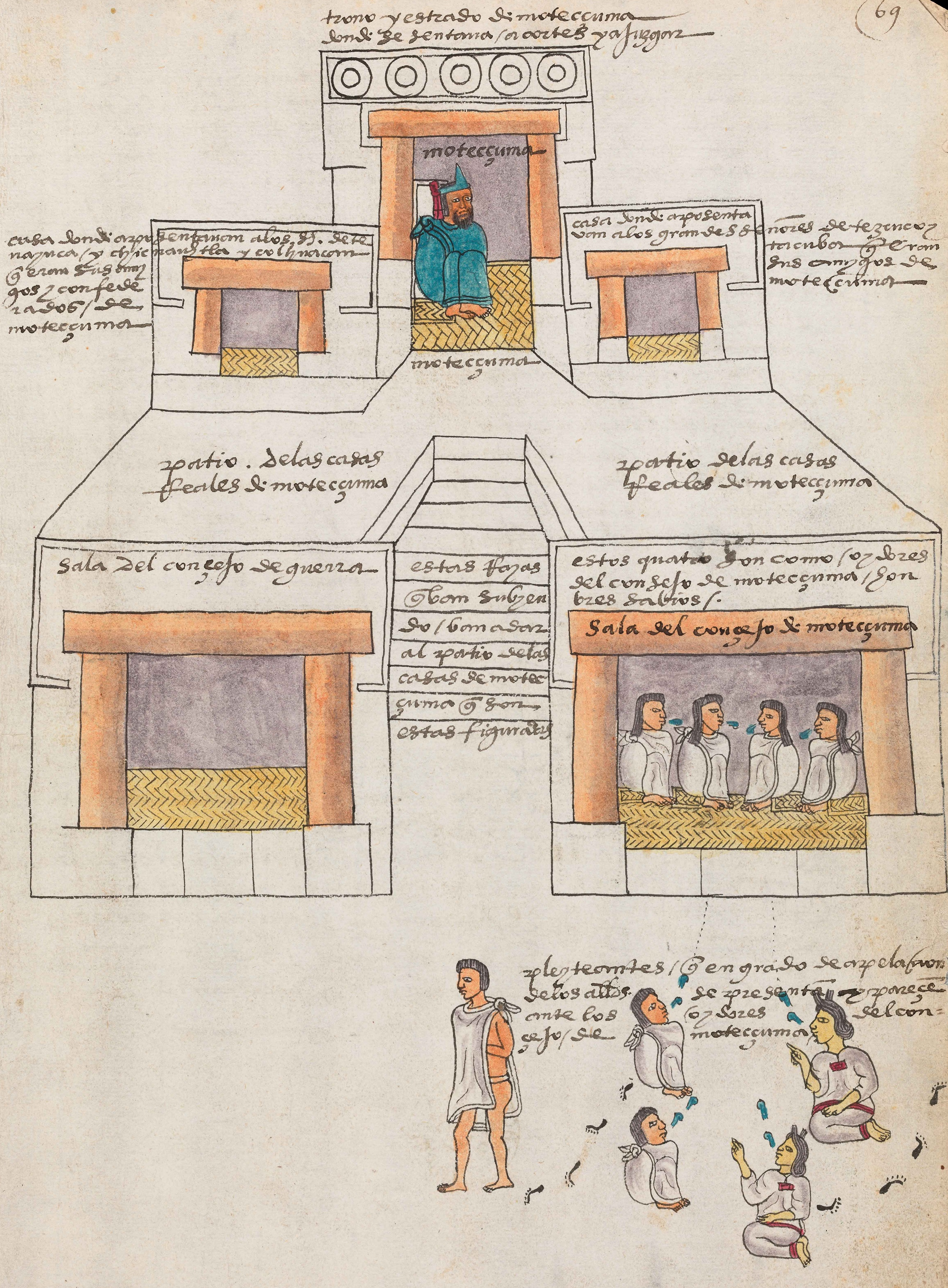
Moctezuma's Palace from the Codex Mendoza (1542)

Casas Nuevas de Moctezuma (English: New Houses of Moctezuma) or tecpan is the name of a pre-hispanic residential complex composed of five interconnected palaces with large platforms. The complex served as the royal palace and chambers of Tenochtitlan's ninth emperor Moctezuma II, who was the Aztec leader during the arrival of Hernán Cortés.

The name casa nuevas ("new houses") was given to distinguish the palaces from previous Aztec palaces. The stones of these buildings were used for the construction of the National Palace of Mexico. Those were the first houses of the Aztec empire built with a basement and at least two floors. Moctezuma's II house had 20 doors and three patios. The house had many beds and could shelter at least 30 men. The houses also sheltered a wide variety of animal species.

The site was uncovered in 2008, during a partial renovation of the Museo Nacional de las Culturas, along with a series of excavations led by archaeologist Elsa Hernández Pons. The site is several layers deep because the Spanish colonials built Mexico City on top of the Aztec buildings.

Moctezuma's Casa Denegrida, or "black house", was among the discoveries found. It was a window-less room that was painted black and served as Moctezuma's meditating place.

== Related pages ==
- Casa Denegrida de Moctezuma
- Palace of Axayacatl
