= Dos Pesos gold coin =

Mexican gold coin

Dos Pesos
- Mexico
- Value: 2 Mexican Peso
- Diameter: 13 mm (0.512 in)
- Thickness: 1.02 mm (0.040 in)
- Edge: Reeded Pattern
- Composition: 90% Gold, 10% copper
- Gold: 0.0482 troy oz
- Years of minting: 1919–1920; 1944-1948
- Mint marks: Mexican Mint Mo.
- Catalog number: KM#461

Obverse
- Design: National arms

Reverse
- Design: Date above value within wreath

The 2 Pesos or Dos Pesos gold coin was produced in Mexico between 1919 and 2009, with dates including 1919, 1920, 1944, 1945, 1946 and 1947. The Dos Pesos contains 0.0482 (slightly under 1/20) troy ounces of fine gold, which is equivalent to 1.50 grams, along with copper, and measures 13 mm in diameter.

== Design ==
Obverse side displays the Coat of arms of Mexico depicting a Mexican golden eagle perched on a prickly pear cactus devouring a snake. The reverse side includes the denomination surrounded by a garland wreath.

The coin was produced by the Mexican Mint, which is the oldest mint in North America. The Mexico City Mint produced gold pesos in denominations ranging from two pesos to fifty. Each denomination shared a common design with the 2 peso gold coin being the smallest denomination gold coin issued for circulation by the United Mexican States.

== Production ==
Production began in 1919 with a mintage of 1,670,000 coins and continued briefly through 1920. Production resumed in 1944 and continued through 1948, although no 1948 dated specimens are known. During 1951-1972 a total of 4,590,493 pieces were restruck, most likely dated 1945. In 1996 matte restrikes were produced, and an additional 260,000 pieces dated 1945 were struck during 2000–2009.
