= Palace of Axayacatl =

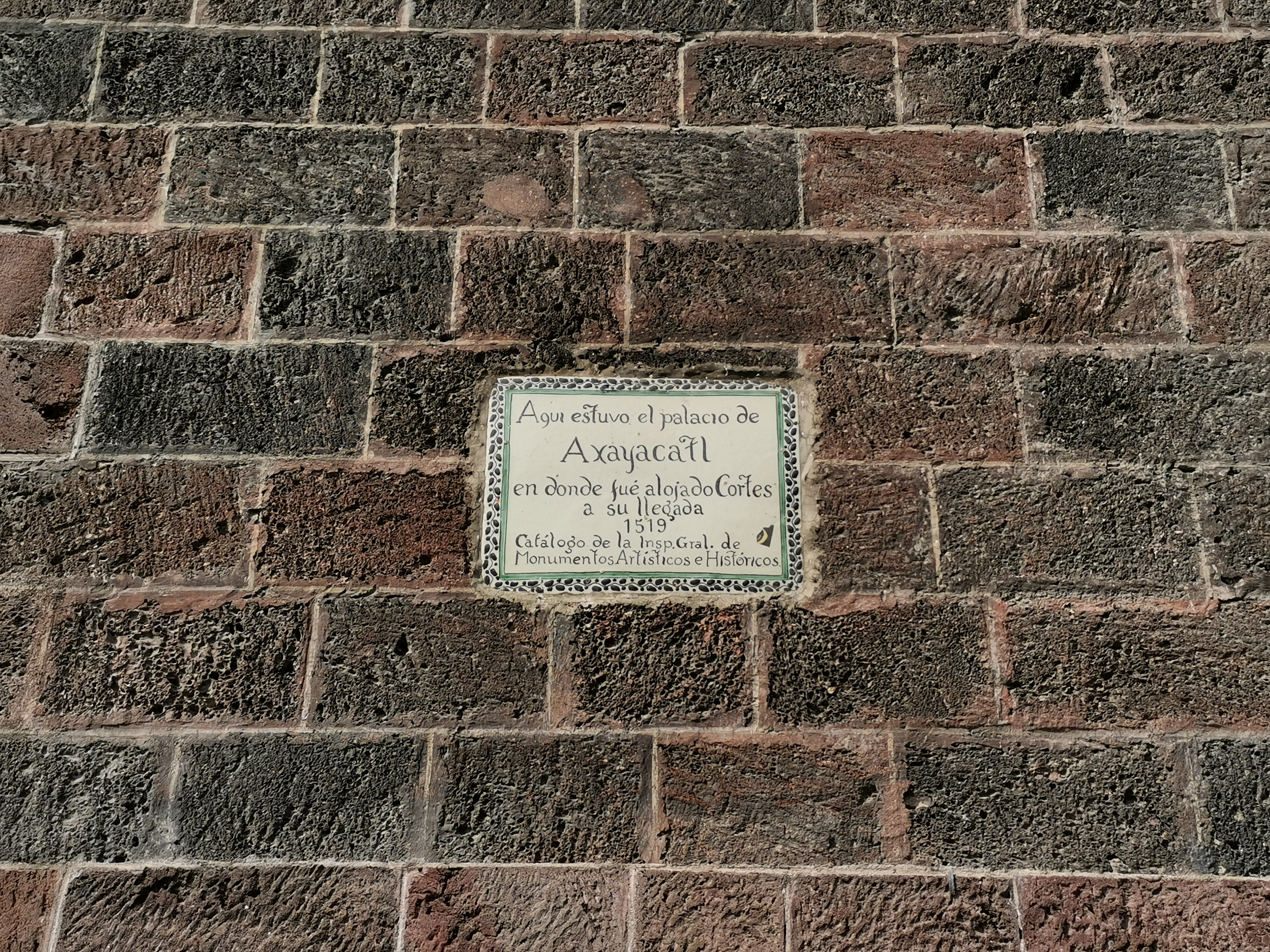
- Plaque marking the site of the former palace
- Location in Mexico City
- 19°26.061′N 99°8.045′W
- Location: Mexico City, Mexico

History
- Built: Between 1469–79
- Built for: Axayacatl
- Demolished: c. 1521

The Palace of Axayacatl, also known as the Old House of Moctezuma, (Spanish: Palacio de Axayácatl) is the name of a pre-Hispanic residential complex composed of interconnected palaces. The complex served as the royal palace and chambers of Tenochtitlan's sixth emperor Axayacatl, and later as the residence of Hernán Cortés.

Only ruins of the Palace exist today.

== Aztec history ==
The Palace was built during the reign of Axayacatl (1469–81), and it was completed no later than 1479. During his life, Axayacatl used the palace as his main living quarters.

The Palace was then passed down to Axayacatl's son Moctezuma II in 1481, and he lived there until he moved into the "New Houses" built specifically for the ninth emperor. While he lived at the Palace, Moctezuma kept hundreds of objects made from gold and jade on display which were later melted down by the conquistadors.

== Colonial history ==
Moctezuma housed conquistador Hernán Cortés within the Palace in 1519; within months, he had converted the building into a massive fortress with embrasures for cannons and crenels for musketeers. Here, he imprisoned several Mesoamerican rulers including Moctezuma II, who was put under house arrest in the hopes that Cortés could rule through him. In May 1520, several of these rulers were killed during a religious festival at the Palace.

After Moctezuma II died within the grounds of the Palace in 1520, the Palace was demolished around 1521 and rubble from the demolished palace was used by Alonso García Bravo to construct a new residence for Hernan Cortés between c. 1521–25. The building then became the seat of the first cabildo government of Mexico City in 1525. Cortés used the building until 1530 and it stayed within his family until 1562, when it was acquired by the Spanish crown.

The main office of the pawnshop known as the Nacional Monte de Piedad was built on the site between 1774–77, and they acquired the site in 1836.

== Discovery and excavation ==
In September 2017, during renovations at the main office of the Nacional Monte de Piedad, workers discovered pre-Columbian basalt ruins underneath the floor of the modern pawnshop building. By August 2018, archaeologists Raúl Barrera Rodríguez and José María García Guerrero had discovered a second room belonging to the Palace.

== Description ==
=== Description of the Palace ===
The Palace was likely a large building with an outdoor courtyard area.

=== Surviving ruins ===
The surviving ruins of Cortés' residence consist of a basalt floor, columns, and walls reaching no higher than 3 metres (9.8 ft) that date to around 1521 which incorporated older stonework from the Palace, indicated by several reworked glyphs such as a depiction of Quetzalcōātl. Underneath these ruins, an older paved basalt floor was found, which belonged to the Palace courtyard.

The site is several layers deep because the Spanish colonials built Mexico City on top of the Aztec buildings.
