= Tecpan (architecture) =

Mesoamerican royal aristocratic palace

A tecpan (Nahuatl: "teuctli" (Lord) + "pan" (palace)) is a Mesoamerican royal aristocratic palace or mansion. In contrast to the Aztec temple pyramids (teocalli), tecpans were typically large, square, one-story structures built on a low platform. These palaces were central to Aztec political administration.

== Tecpan significance ==
Tecpans were distinguished from other Aztec palaces, often by their large size and important role. Tecpans could be for administrative, residential, or pleasure purposes. Other important noble houses could be classified as pilcalli, huehuecalli, and tequihuacacalli if of lesser importance or scale, but approval was always required for the foundation of a new tecpan from a noble. Tecpans could also be the benefactor of lands surrounding them. Land tenure exercised over territories of different cities used for subsistence production could be referred to as tecpantlalli or land of houses and the community palace. These territories also provided service work and labor to the palaces.

== Architecture of Tecpans ==
The layout of a tecpan in the Late Postclassic Period often consisted of large nearly square buildings facing into the main plazas with a courtyard overlooked by the by a dais room across from the main entrance. Within, the work necessary to support the domestic life of a ruler was performed by palace women assisted by servants in back rooms. Additionally, events of political importance would occur in the courtyard and dais room. Generally, in Aztec society, the homes of lords were situated in the center of towns near locations of religious significance, such as Moctezuma’s Tecpan which was located near the Templo Mayor facing the Zócalo, Tenochtitlan's main plaza.

Most sources on tecpans in Tenochtitlan originate in the 16th century due to the widespread destruction caused by the siege in 1521, but some tecpans continued to serve some purpose if not their original function. After the Spanish conquest, new Tecpans continued to be constructed for use by native and Spanish governors and leaders such as the Tecpan of the Tapia Family in Mexico City. Later tecpans displayed both indigenous and Spanish architectural elements. Other tecpans transitioned to the control of Spanish leaders. For example, Franciscan missionary Pedro de Gante resided in Nezahualcoyotl's palace complex in Texcoco, and he also later used the layout of tecpans in other public architecture as a way of connecting with the indigenous populations.

== Spanish Colonial descriptions of Tecpans ==
Dominican Friar Diego Durán's History of the Indies of New Spain (1579) includes descriptions and images of tecpan architecture.

The ownership of Tecpans was considered a debated subject between Spanish and indigenous populations. Crucially, Spanish often considered Tecpans private property while many indigenous populations recognized them as community buildings.

== Surviving examples of Tecpans ==
- Casas Nuevas de Moctezuma
- Palacio de Ocomo
