= Oconahua =

Town in Jalisco, Mexico

Coordinates: 20°44′N 104°09′W

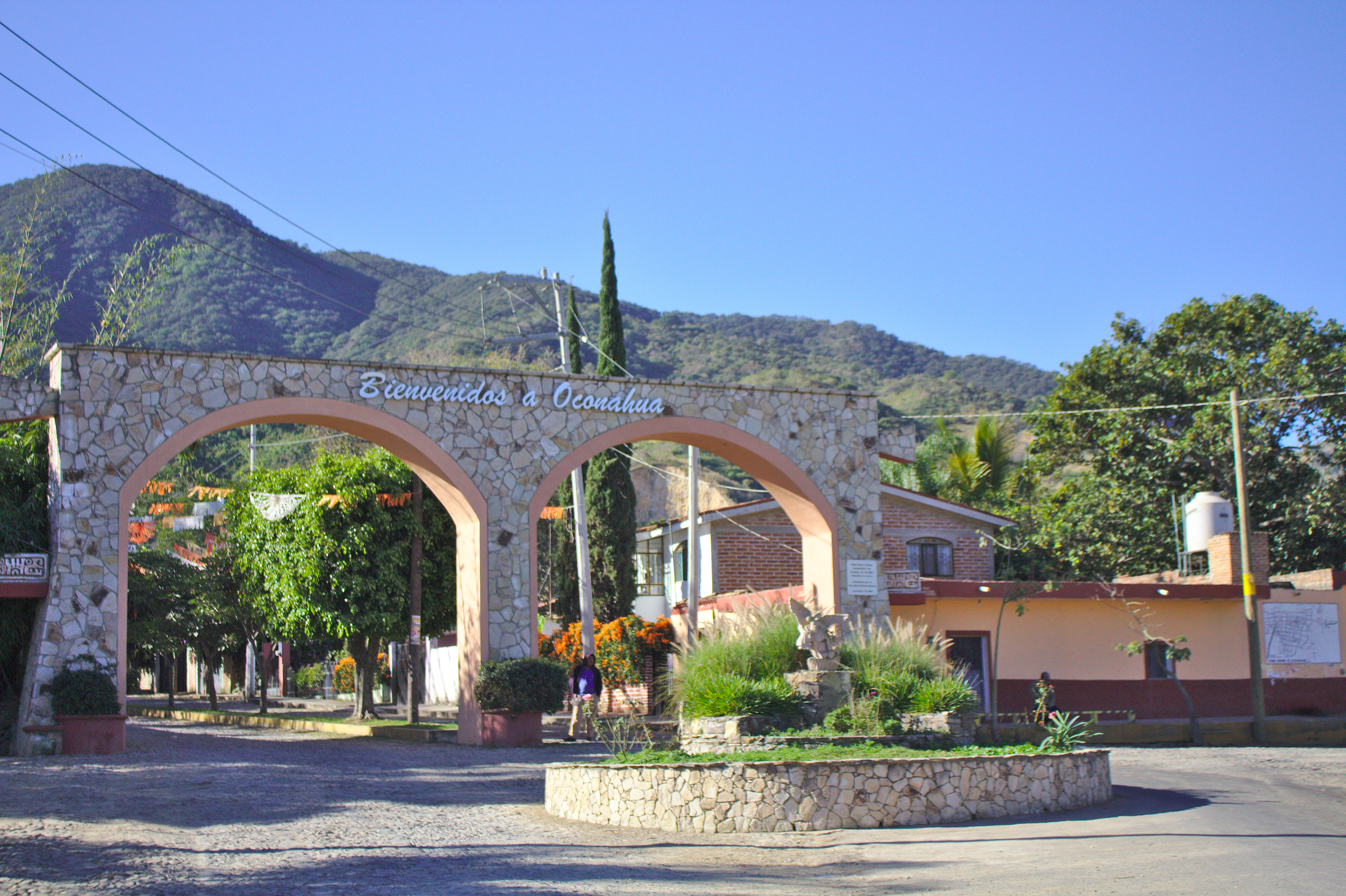
Entrance to the small town of Oconahua, Jalisco, located in the Etzatlan municipality.

Oconahua is a small town in the Mexican state of Jalisco. It is a Delegation of the municipality of Etzatlán. The population was 2,360 according to the 2020 census.

== Geography ==
Oconahua is located in the West of Jalisco, approximately to 100 km of Guadalajara and to the northeast of the Ameca sub-region. It has an altitude of 1490 meters above sea level and limits with San Marcos Municipality to the north, to the South with Puerta de Pericos Delegation, to the east with Etzatlán's municipal top part, to the west with San Rafael's Delegation and Nayarit's borderings.

== Festival ==
In September the festivals begin, celebration the saint of the town. Bullfighting is a big factor for most, but there are also many small rides and the burning of a "castillo" which is a huge pyrotechnic design. At night a band plays till late at night and most go dancing at the center of the town called the plaza. The festival begins 20 and goes on until end of the month.

== History ==
The Ocomo Palace is an archeological site in Oconahua. It is the most monumental structure and best preserved within a site of nearly 400 hectares (a metric unit of square measures, equal to 100 ares, 2.471 acres or 10,000 square meters). There are remains of terraces, sunken courts, pyramids and platforms (the largest and most visible preserved, measuring forty by thirty feet). The building can be dated between the Epi and early Postclassic Period (900–1200 CE).

This palace is very similar to the palace of Quinantzin, drawn in the codex of the same name, tells the use of this building for administrative, not religious, but was the key as a gateway of trade between the lowlands and the upper reaches of the West. In the square outside there were four large stelae with carvings and intricate designs, including possible glyphs. These stelae were destroyed by a Franciscan in the late nineteenth century. Most stones are carved bas-relief, although there are fragments of sculptures in the round.

Oconahua, a community located 10 miles from municipal Etzatlán which has about 2100 inhabitants. Oconahua, small valley crossed by two streams and located at the bottom of the Serrania de Ameca to 1490 meters, is a farming community with some Indian identity is said to have been founded between 1512 and 1515 by Aztec tribes led by a woman named "Tepelzamoca" who first gives the name to the place of "Cacalotlán", then "Huexolotlán" and finally, in 1521 Pedro de Alvarado and Cristobal de Olid, name it "Oconahua". Their economic activities are agriculture with crops like corn and livestock in the field's poultry, pork and beef. Its streets are paved and the construction of their homes and show no uniformity in a large number of them are made of brick contrasting sharply with several adobe homes yet. As almost all of the communities in Jalisco, Oconahua has a main square with its integrated Kiosk. In the south, well groomed, wearing his only temple dedicated to St. Michael the Archangel, while to the north, are the administrative offices of this place.

Although many people have implied that Moctezuma was a retiring king, more contemplative than bellicose, colonial codices point out that he was an accomplished warrior and managed to extend the tributary system rather than lose land, like Tizoc before him. Campaigns under his name travelled south to Tapachula in the Xoconochco region (in the modern state of Chiapas) and the Chontal Maya states of Xicallanco in Tabasco. This is where Cortés would find La Malinche, noblewoman and interpreter, during the conquest. Some kingdoms remained defiant, such as the Purépecha to the west, and the neighbouring Tlaxcallans. Nevertheless, the Aztec empire was at its largest when the Spanish arrived in 1519.

=== Codex Mendoza ===
The Codex Mendoza shows all the lands that Moctezuma conquered. Many territories regularly rose up against the Aztecs and had to be conquered again. For this reason their names were repeatedly painted into codices, part of the tally of conquests made during the reigns of different Huey Tlatoque. The state of Huexolotlan, for example, appears in the Codex Mendoza under the conquests of the emperors Ahuítzotl (1486-1502), and Moctezuma (1502– 1520). One of the great things that Moctezuma did was to conquer the South-eastern region of Xoconochco, a place full of great riches. There, one could find precious blue/green Quetzal feathers, gold, jaguar skins and cocoa beans. These were great luxuries for the Aztecs, who could not produce them in their cold highland capital.

Moctezuma is written off as a just, even ruler, unlike Ahuítzotl who was less predictable. The previous king was said to greatly enjoy the company of women, a delight professed to be shared by warrior types. Although Moctezuma is reported to have been married to “thousands of women”, this was to form marital alliances through the daughters and nieces of provincial chiefs and smaller kings who ruled their regions whilst under Aztec domination. Only two wives were allowed to be “of the mat”, or “official” wives, they were Tezalco and Acatlán. Their superior position amongst the wives was unquestioned and they were both of Toltec descent.

==== Linen of Tlaxcala ====
History of Tlaxcala is an illustrated codex written by and under the supervision of Diego Muñoz Camargo in the years leading up to 1585. Also known as Lienzo Tlaxcala ("Linen of Tlaxcala") and by its Spanish title, Historia de Tlaxcala, this manuscript highlights the religious, cultural, and military history of the Tlaxcaltec people, in particular focusing on the post-conquest aspects. The History of Tlaxcala is divided into three sections:

1. "Relaciones Geográficas" or "Descripción de la ciudad y provincia de Tlaxcala", a Spanish text written by Camargo between 1581 and 1584 in response to Philip II of Spain's Relaciones Geográfica questionnaire.
2. The "Tlaxcala Calendar", a largely pictorial section, with both Spanish and Nahuatl captions.
3. The "Tlaxcala Codex" a largely pictorial section, with both Spanish and Nahuatl captions.

=== Cristóbal de Olid ===
Cristóbal de Olid (1487–1524) was a Spanish adventurer, conquistador, and rebel who was part of the Spanish conquest of Mexico, including in the Jalisco region.

Olid was born in Zaragoza and grew up in the household of the colonial governor of Cuba, Diego Velázquez de Cuéllar. In 1518 Velázquez sent Olid to relieve Juan de Grijalva, but en route a hurricane destroyed Olid's ship and he returned to Cuba. On January 10, 1519, Olid sailed with Hernán Cortés' fleet, and took an active part in the conquest of Mexico. He fought at the Battle of Otumba on July 8, and also took part in the campaign against the Purépecha, who proved difficult foes due to their use of iron weapons, which the Aztecs lacked.

During the siege of Tenochtitlán, Olid squabbled with Pedro de Alvarado, and refused to assist him in an assault on the causeways leading into the city. This refusal lead to a resounding Spanish defeat, and Olid fled to Coyohuacan. While in Mexico, he married a Tlaxcalan woman.

Olid led the conquest of Jal-ixco (Jalisco) in 1522. He led Spanish soldiers and Tlaxcalan allies in the conquests of the Jalisco and Colima regions of west-central Mexico.

== See also ==
- Aztec codices
- History of Jalisco
