= Museo Nacional de las Culturas =

National museum in Mexico City, Mexico

Coordinates: 19°25′59.77″N 99°7′49.67″W

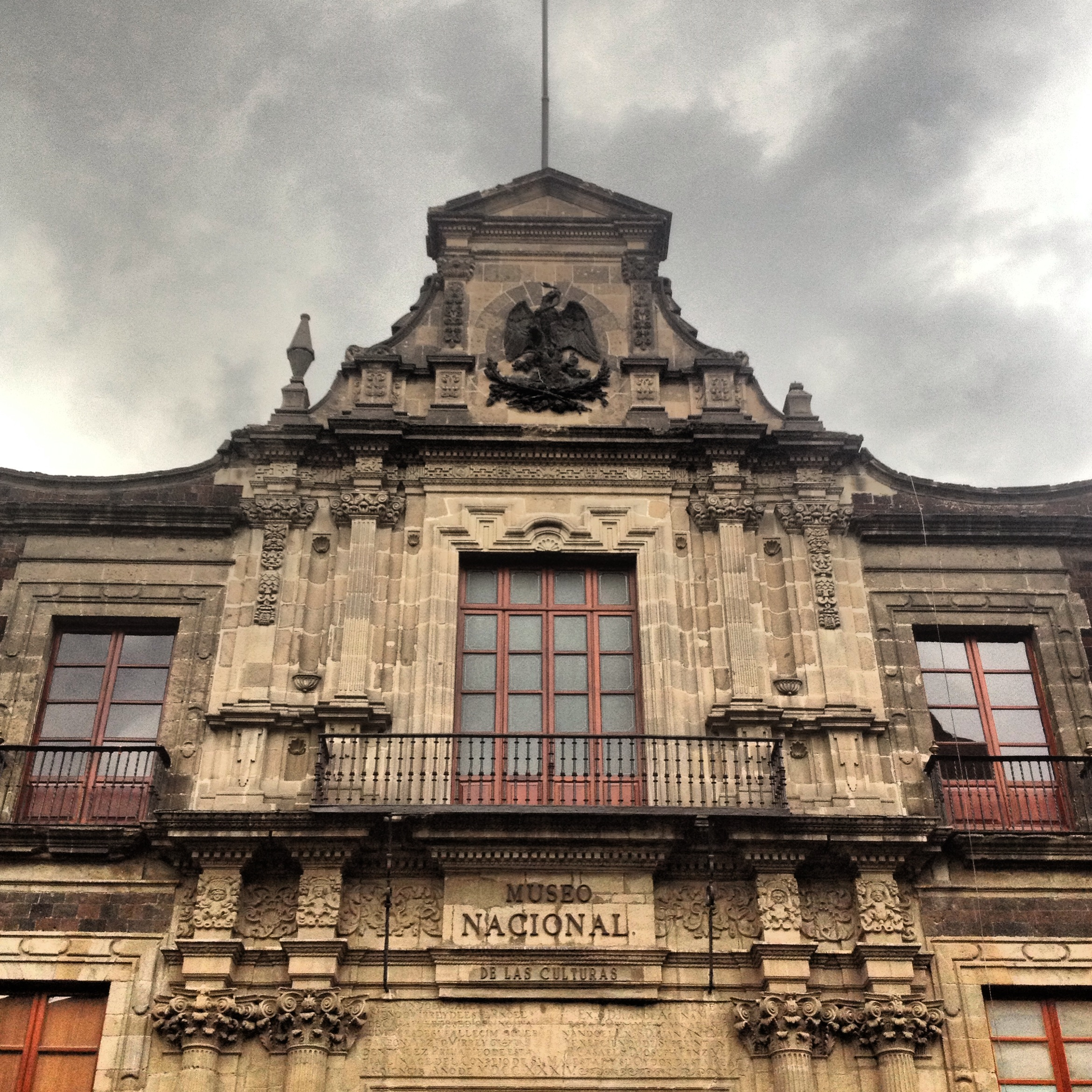
- Above the main entrance of the museum
- Established: December 1965
- Location: Mexico City, Mexico
- Type: Anthropology
- Visitors: 369,865 (2017)
- Director: Gabriela E. López Torres
- Public transit access: Metro Zócalo (Line 2)
- Website: www.museodelasculturas.mx

The Museo Nacional de las Culturas (MNC; National Museum of Cultures) is a national museum in Mexico City dedicated to education about the world's cultures, both past and present. It is housed in a colonial-era building that used to be the mint for making coins. Prior to this, the site was the home of the location of the Moctezuma's Black House. The mint was moved to Apartado Street in 1850, and the building was used for various purposes until it was converted to its current use in 1966.

== Aztec site ==
The museum is located on the site of the original Aztec building that was a part of Moctezuma's "New Palaces" complex called the "Casa Denegrida" (Black House) by Spanish invaders, who described it as a windowless room painted in black. In here, Moctezuma would meditate on what he was told by professional seers and shamans. During the Invasion, this Black House, along with the rest of Moctezuma's New Palaces was nearly destroyed. This site was part of lands given to Hernán Cortés by the Spanish Crown as a reward for the invasion of Mexico, and Cortés rebuilt the New Palaces/Black House complex in Spanish style, using much of the building materials of the old Aztec buildings. Cortes’ son later inherited this palace, only to later sell it back to Felipe V in order to establish the vice-regal palace.

Recently, excavations here and next door at the National Palace have unearthed parts of a wall and a basalt floor believed to be part of the Black House. More excavations are planned.

== Colonial era mint ==
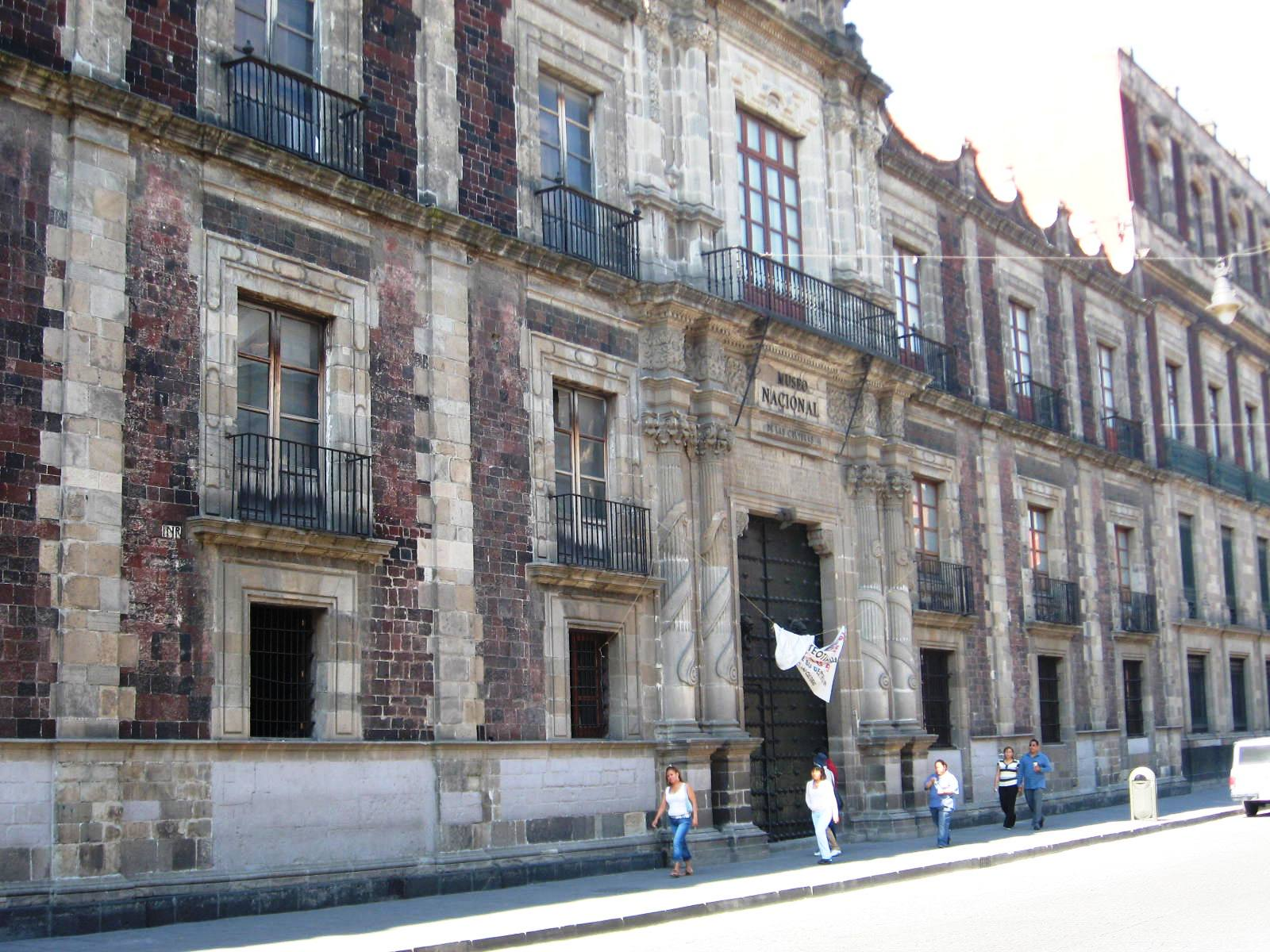
Facade of the museum/mint building

Originally, minting operations were based in the city hall. However, due to the increased prosperity of the colony and the need for more coin production, minting operations were moved here in 1731. The mint's director at the time, Nicolás Peinado, was also an architect and made the initial plans. Worked was carried out by Pedro de Arrieta and Lorenzo Rodríguez. However, problems with the remodeling surfaced, resulting in the viceroy naming Jose Eduardo Herrera to take over, and Peinado ended up in jail. The remodeling was finally completed by Luis Diez Navarro.

This mint is responsible for the name of the street on which it is located, called Moneda, which means "coin". The building was again expanded between 1772 and 1779 by Miguel Constanzó, Lorenzo Rodriguez, and Jose Damian Ortiz

== Conversion to museum ==
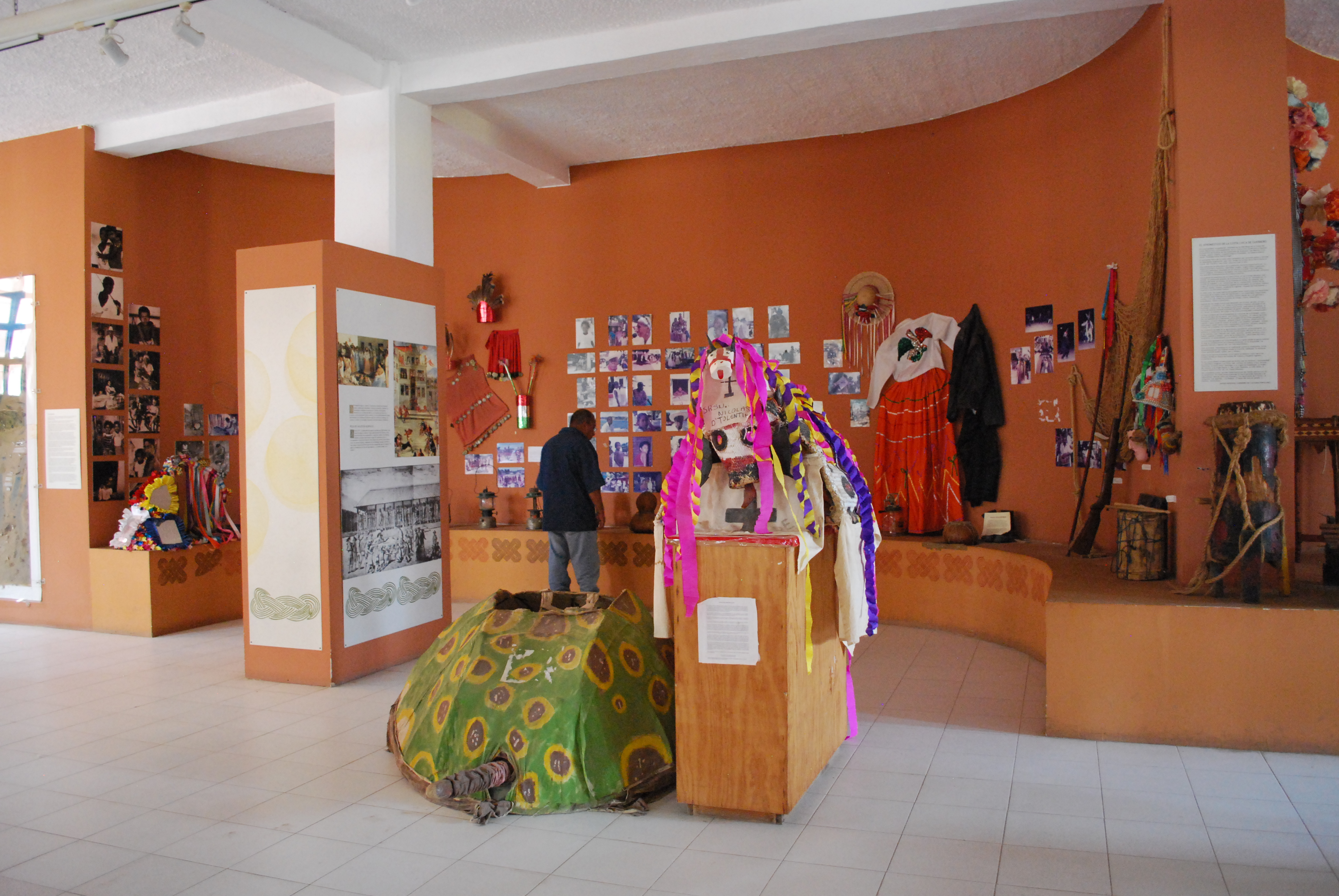
Frames used for the Turtle and Straw Bull dances.

In 1850, minting operations were moved to Apartado Street, and this building was used by a number of entities such as the Engraving School, the Supreme Court, minister of the interior and government graphic design department.

In 1865, Emperor Maximilian decided to put the Public Museum of Natural History, Archeology and History here, beginning with pieces donated by the Royal and Pontifical University of Mexico and the National Museum founded by President Guadalupe Victoria in 1825. At the beginning of the 20th century, artist Rufino Tamayo painted the mural called "La Revolución" (The Revolution) in which he depicts the Mexican Revolution. This mural can still be seen in the lobby. While the museum was initially successful, it eventually declined and much of its collection was moved to other institutions. The collection of items related to natural history was moved to the Chopo Museum in 1909, and the collection of Mexican historical items were mostly moved to the museum at the Castle of Chapultepec in 1944. Much of the remaining items were transferred to the Museo Nacional de Antropología e Historia by 1964.

== National Cultural Museum ==
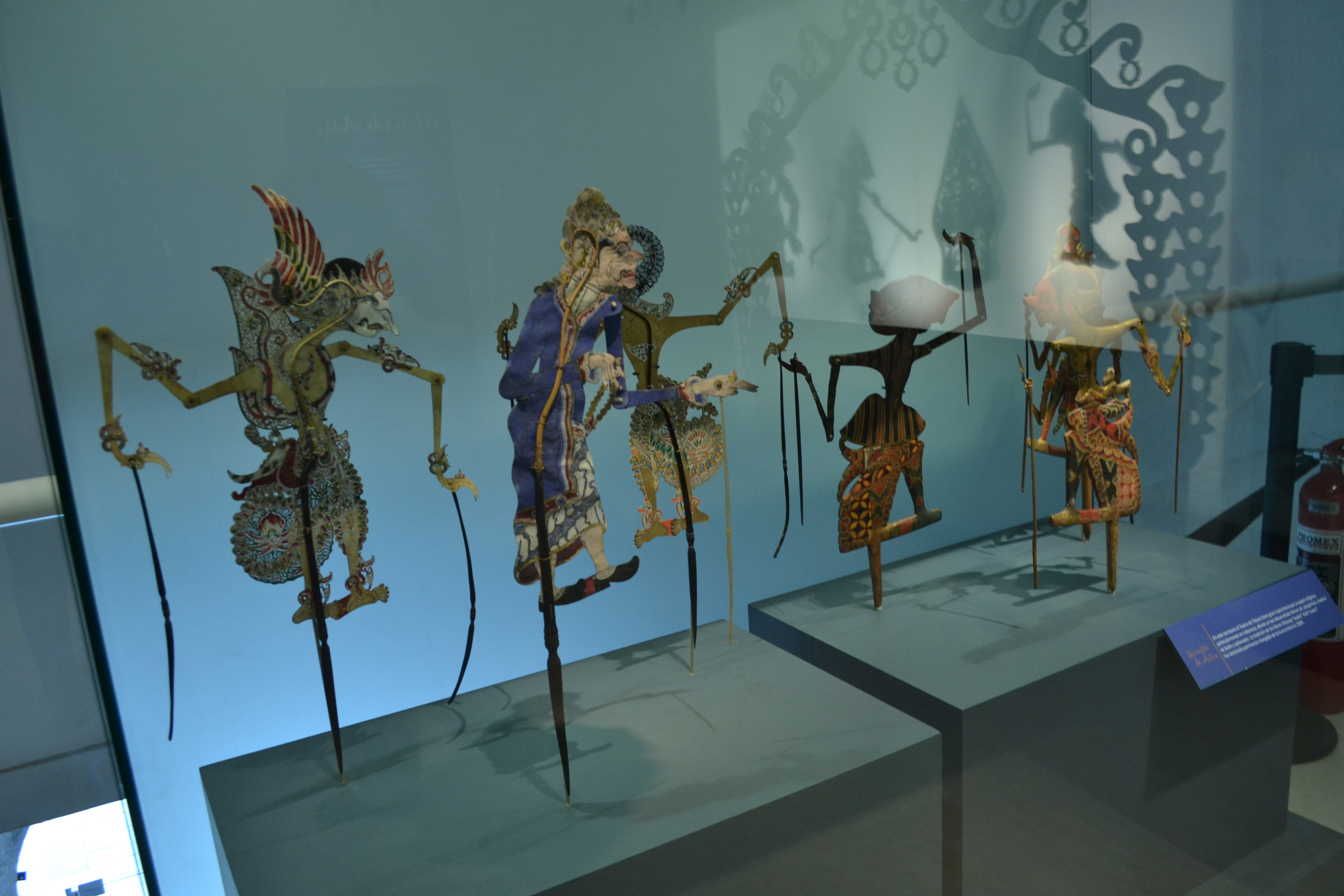
Part of a display on Wayang

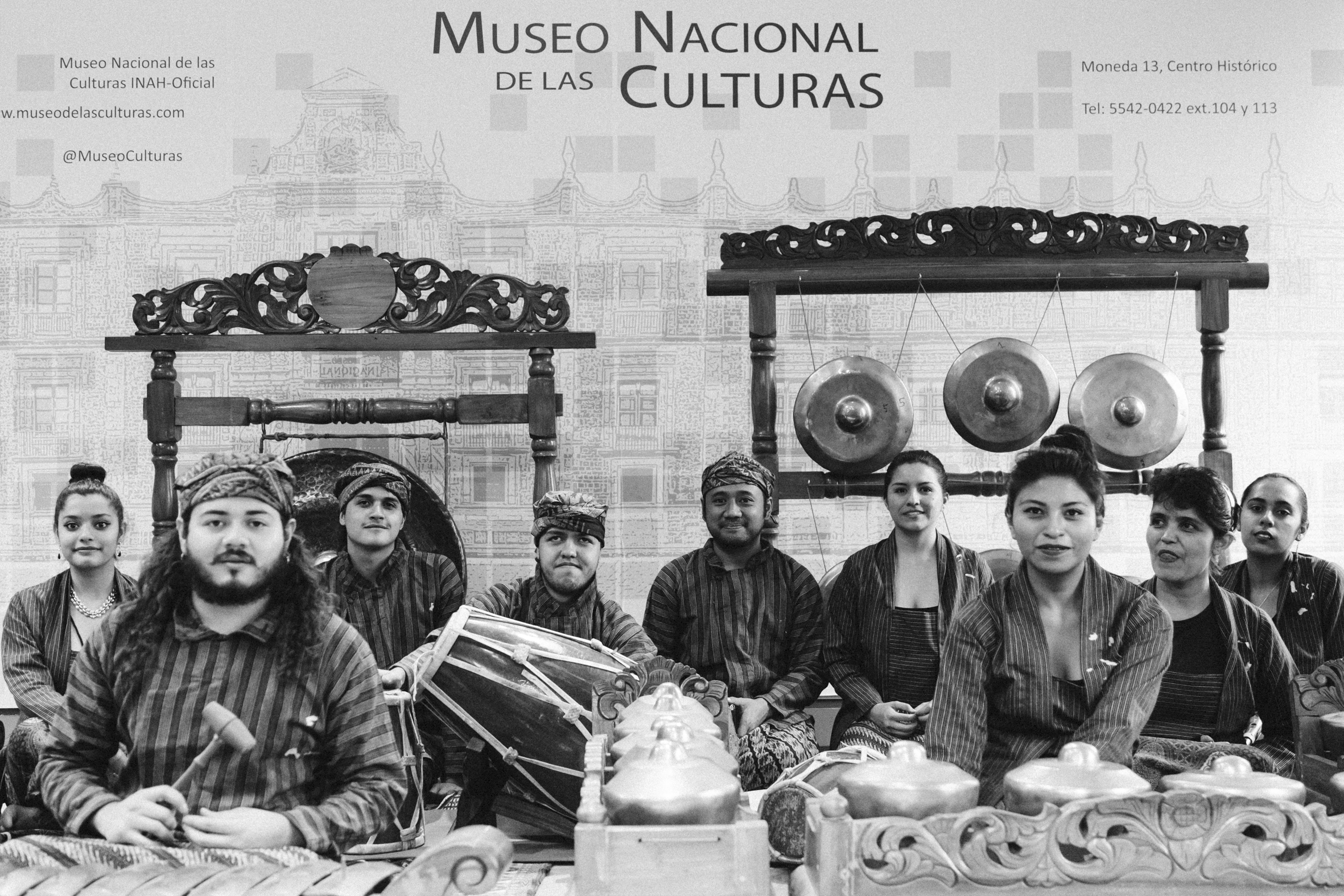
Gamelan group Indra Swara in Mexico.

This colonial-era building was named a national monument in 1931, but when the new Museum of Anthropology opened the site was left vacant. Beatriz Barba and Julio César Olivé proposed that the space be converted into a museum featuring world cultures. After renovation, the building opened on 5 December 1965, with Barba serving as its deputy director until 1976 as the Cultural Museum, with rooms dedicated to demonstrating cultural artifacts from around the world. This museum dedicated to the world's past and present cultures is the only one of its type in Latin America. The museum has sixteen permanent display rooms and three rooms for temporary exhibits. Some of the rooms are dedicated prehistoric cultures remains such as cave paintings and implements associated with the origins of sedentary, agricultural societies. Other rooms are devoted to ancient Mesopotamia as well as ancient Greece and Rome.

In the Age of Exploration room, items from the time of initial European contact with the Americas are on display. For modern cultures, there are exhibits from all continents and some dedicated to cultures little-known in Mexico such as that of Samoa or New Ireland. Since its founding, the museum has received over 12,000 pieces from around the world. These pieces include textiles, glass objects, porcelain, photographs, arms, kimono, masks, jewelry and sculptures. Many of these objects are originals and some are quite old. The museum still receives donations of objects. One of the most recent is of board inlaid with mother-of-pearl from Vietnam.

== Gallery ==
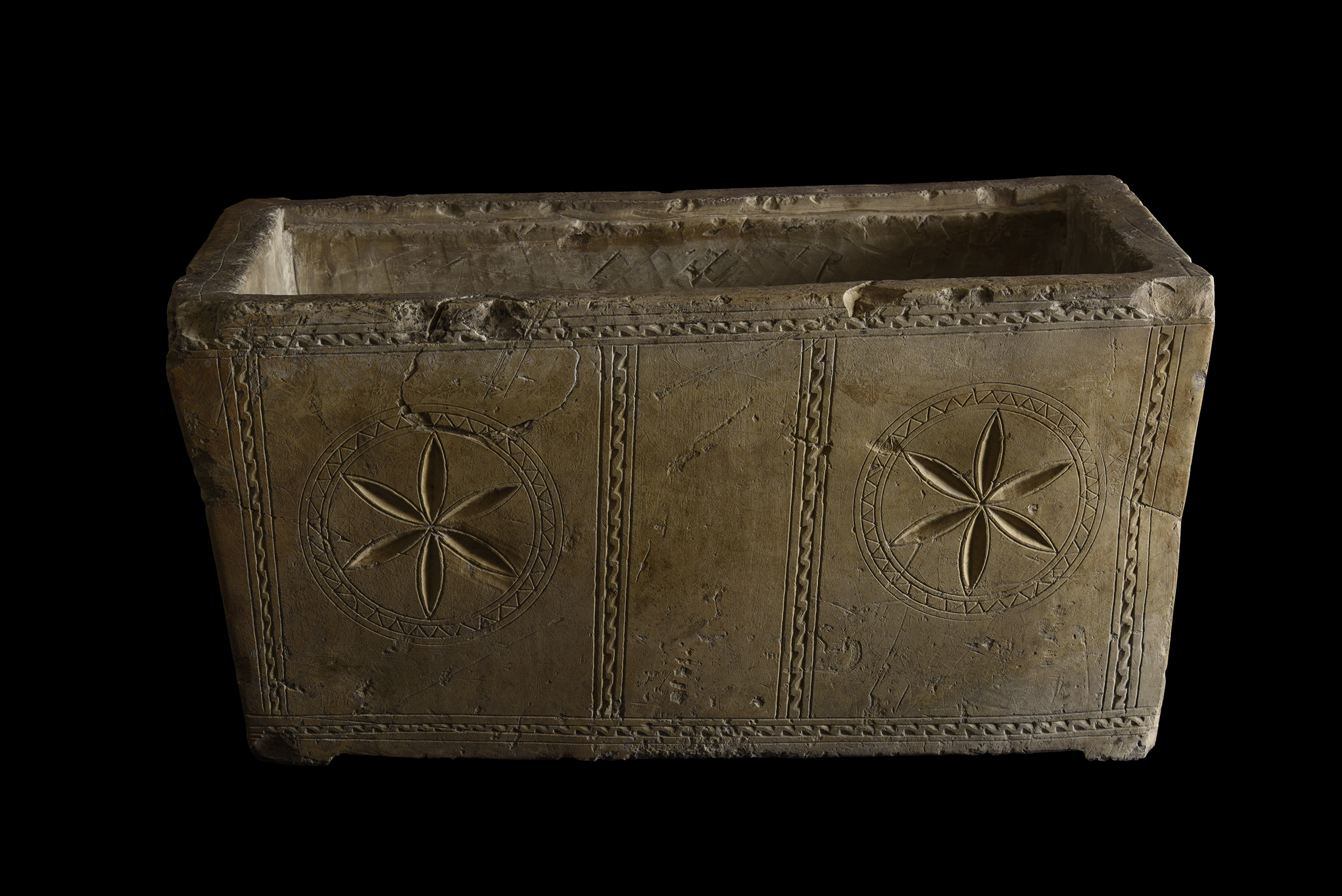

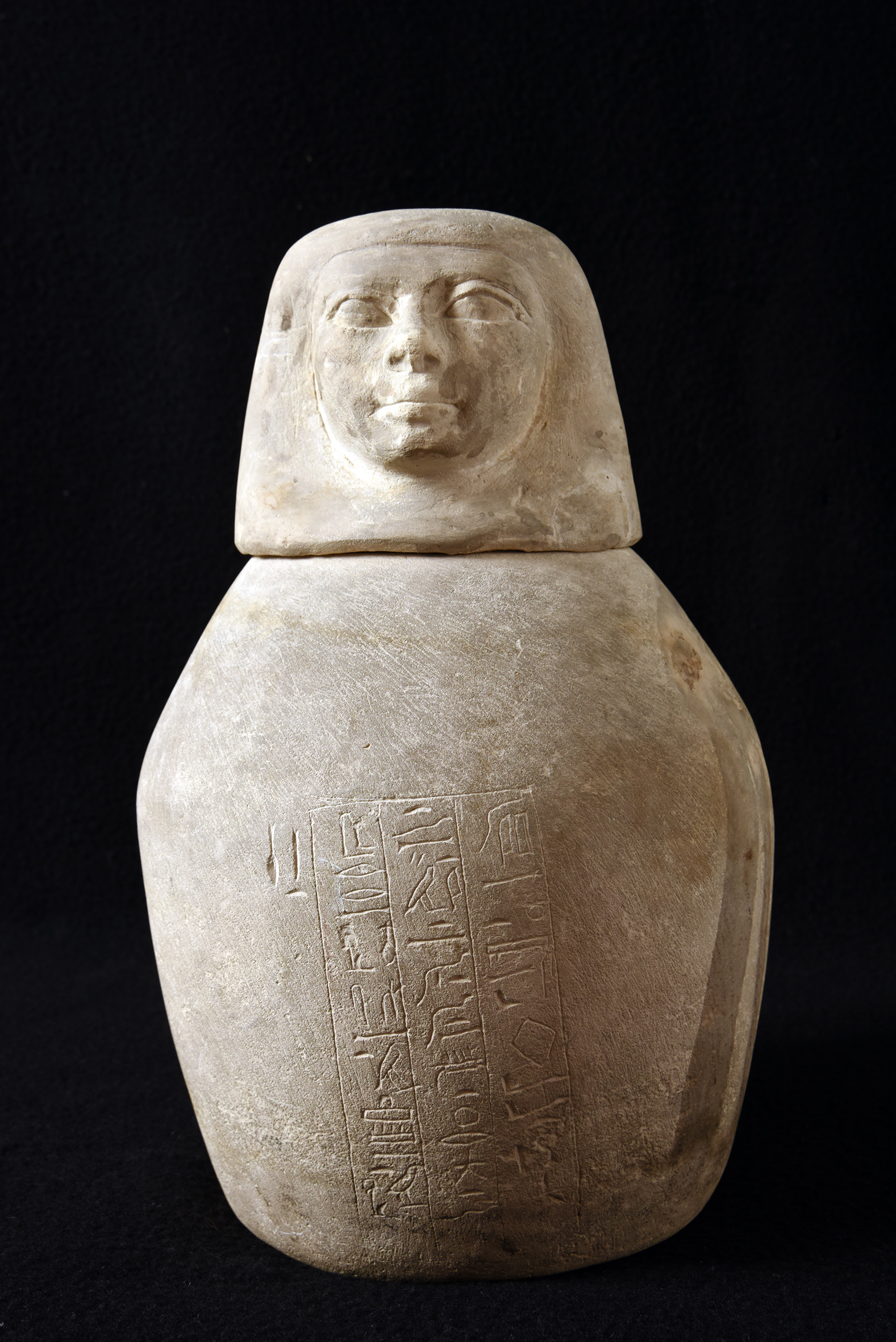

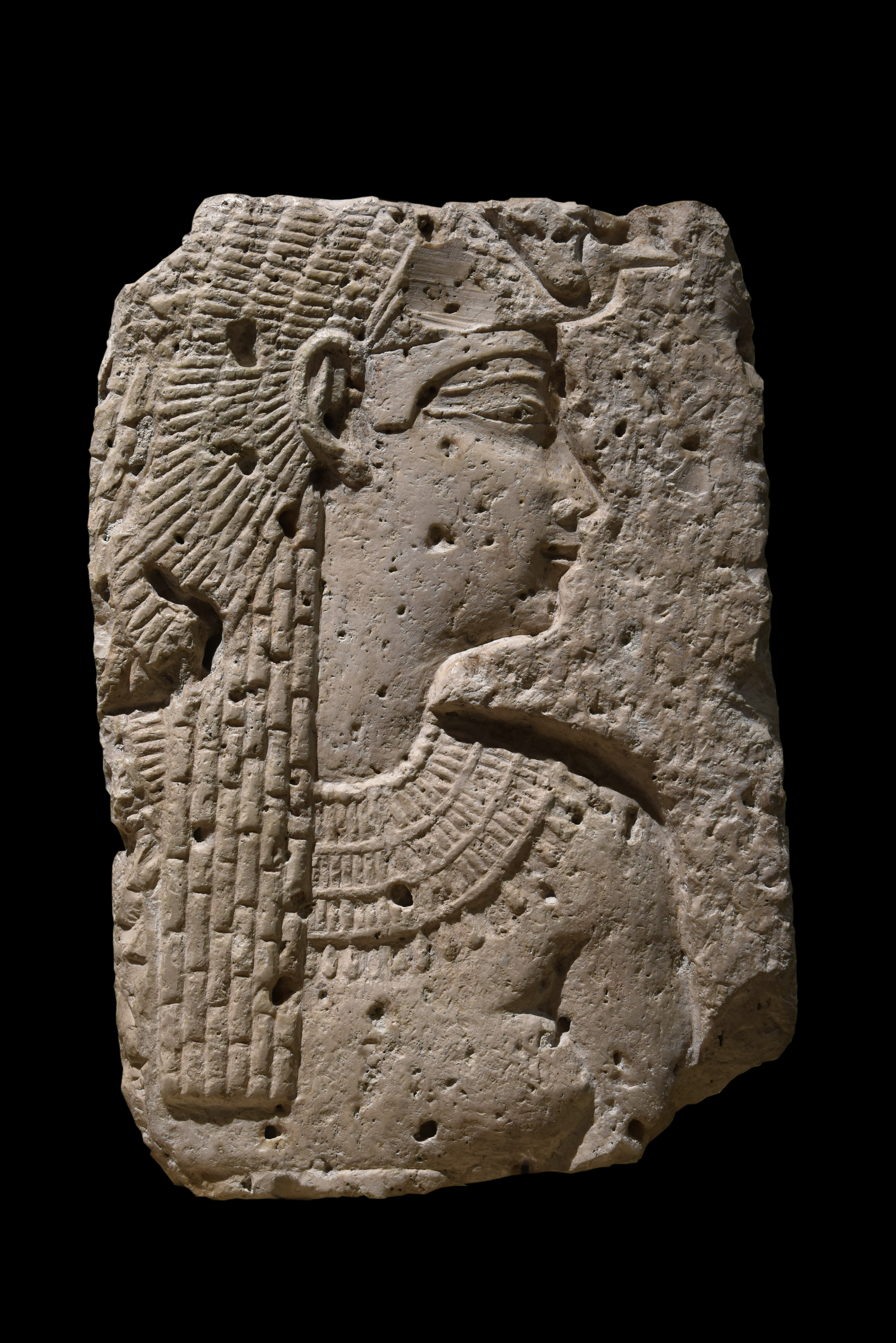

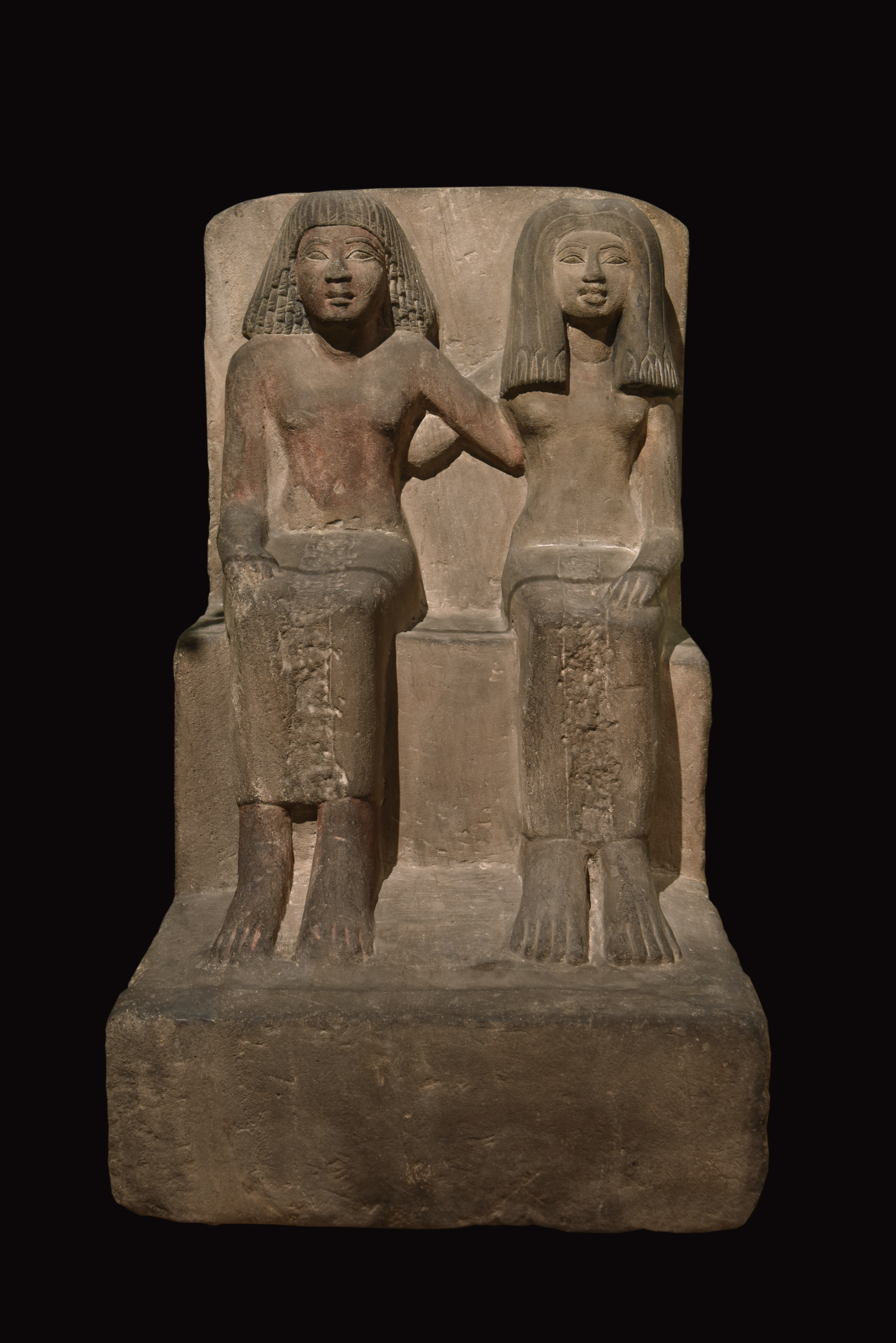

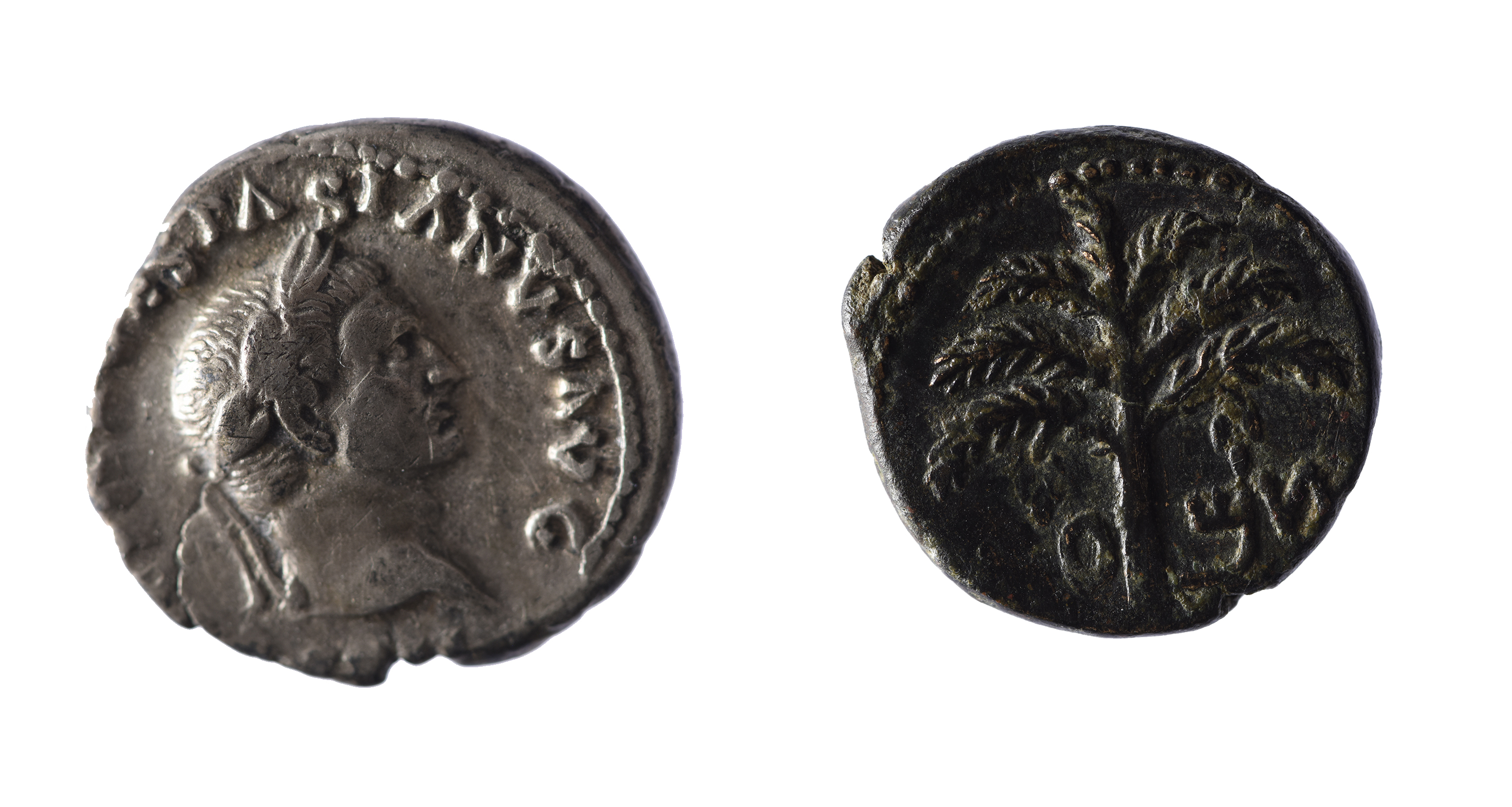

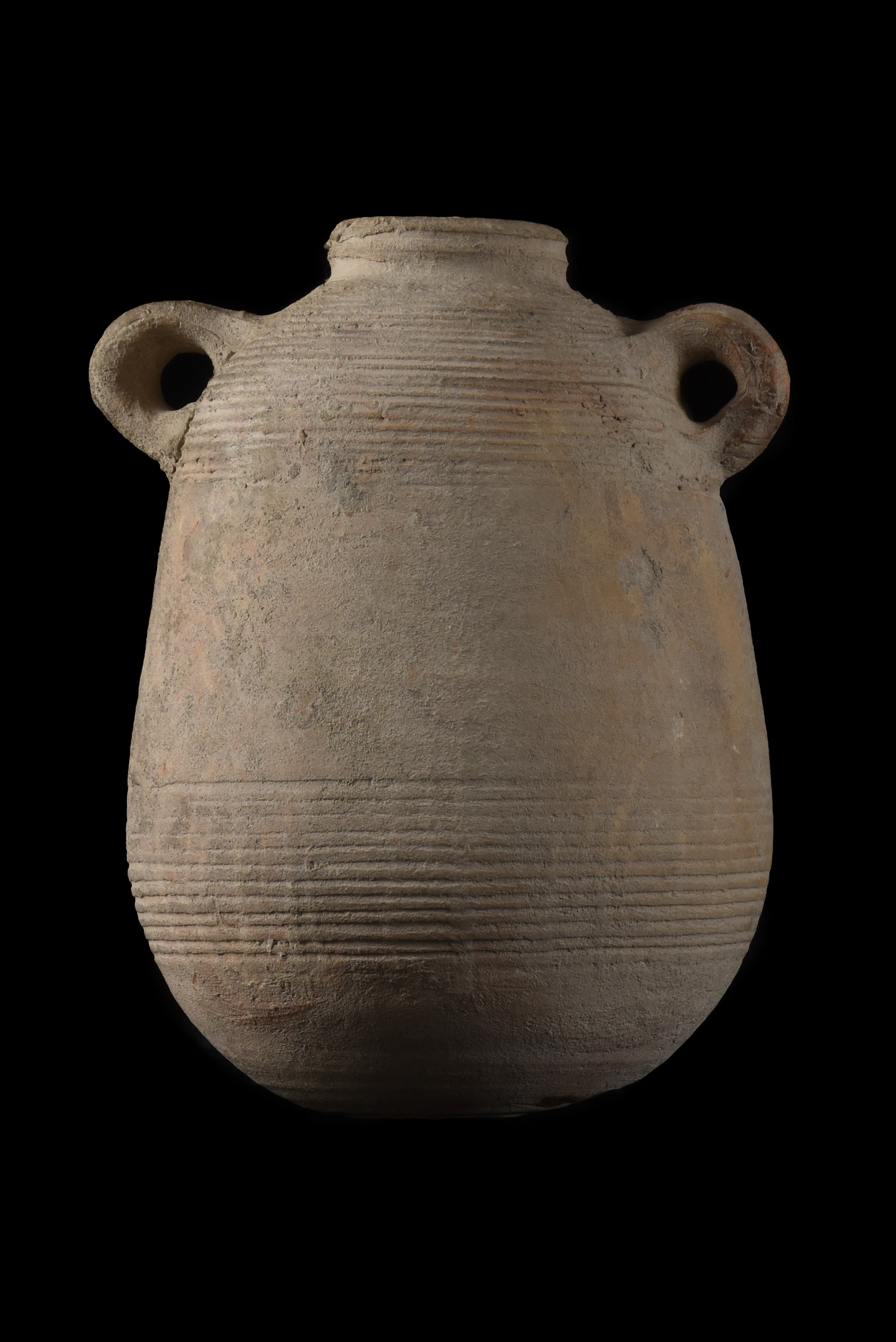

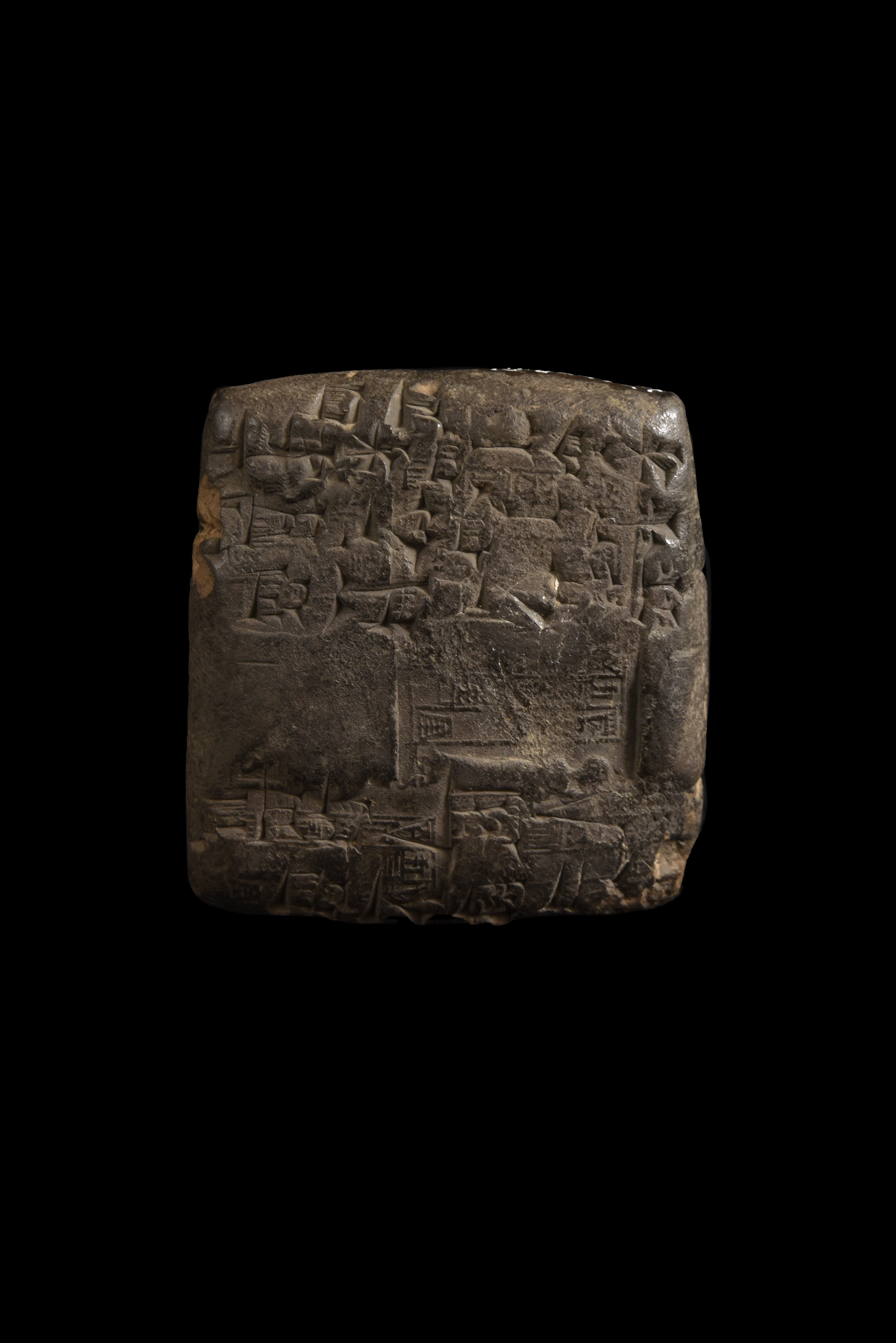

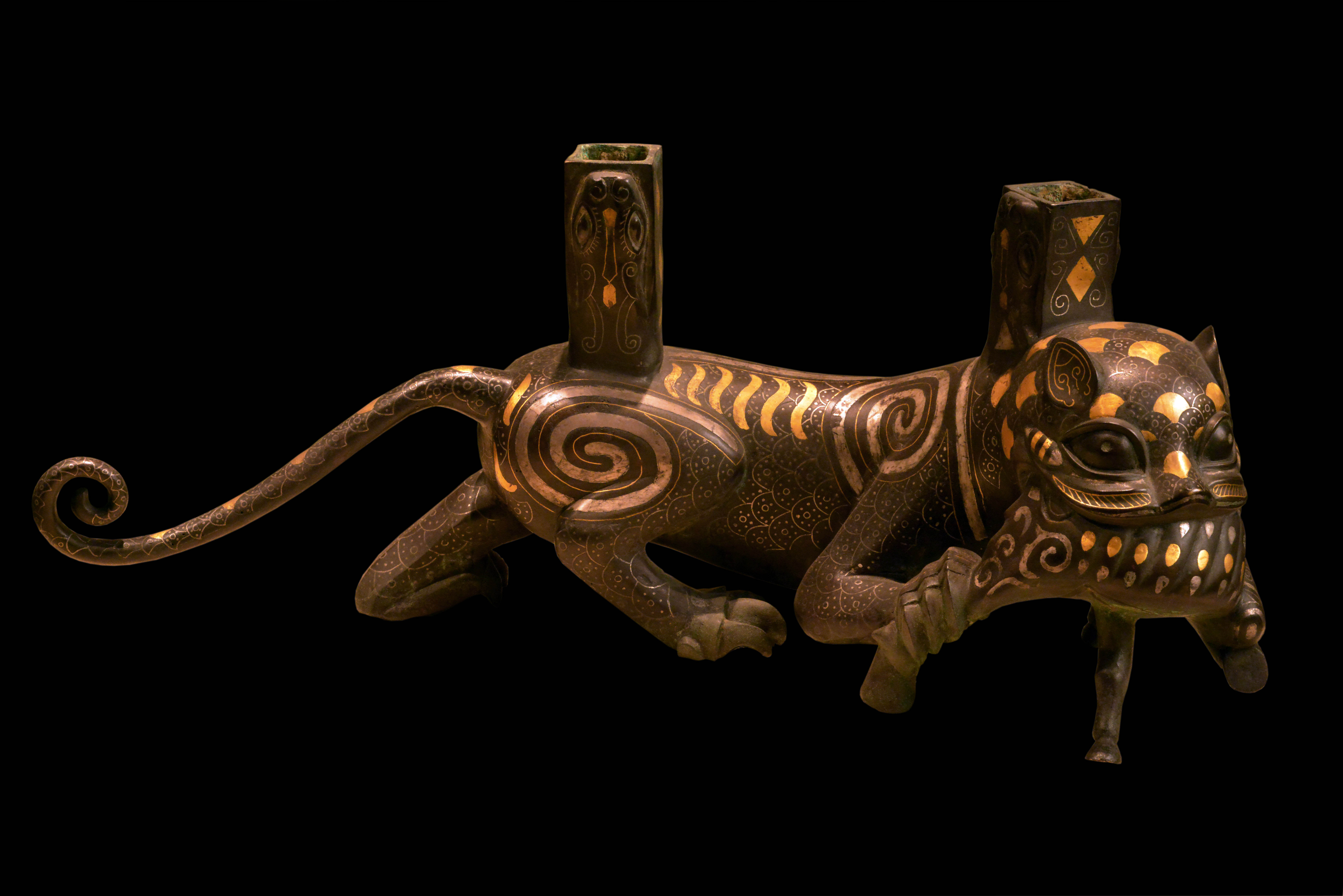

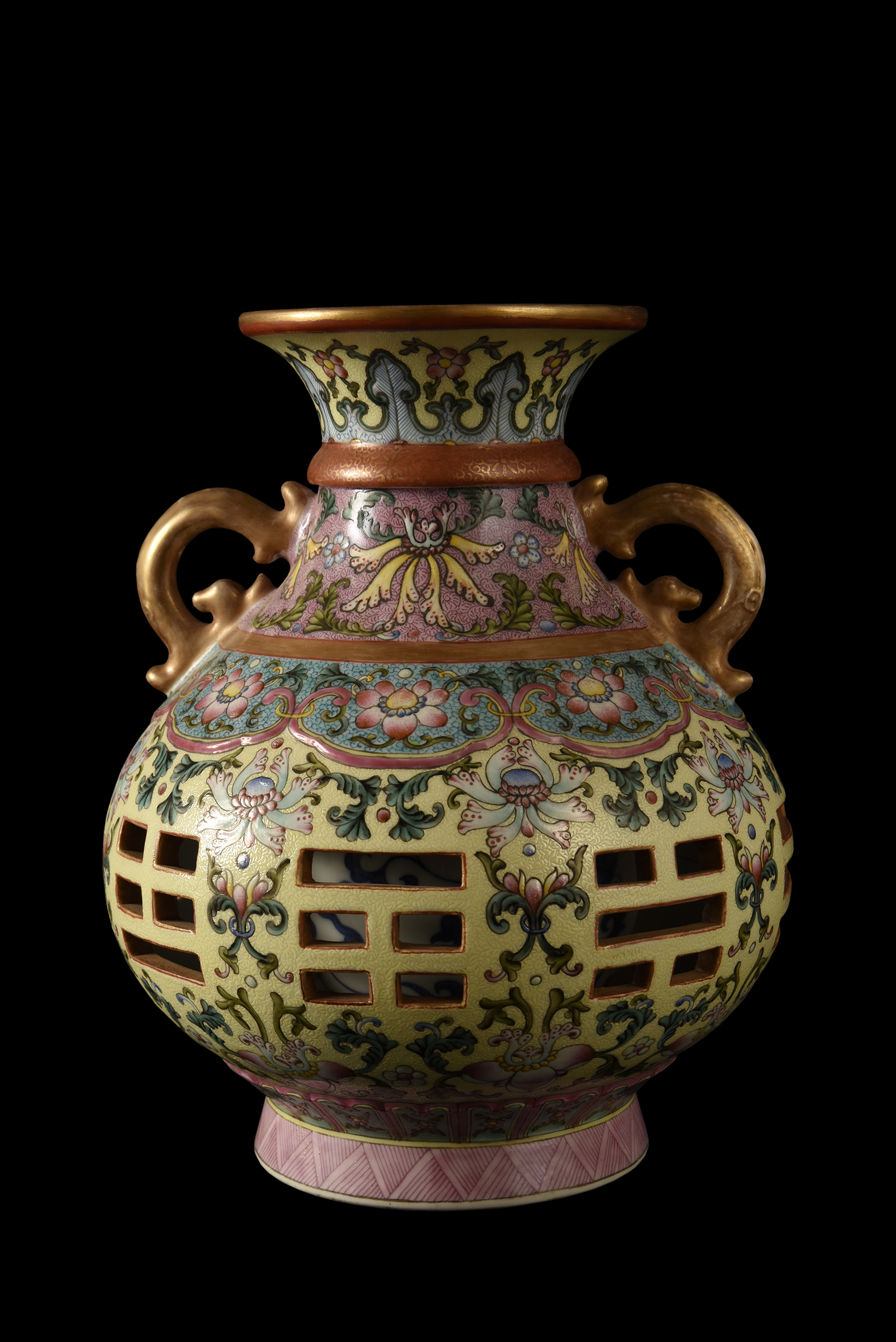

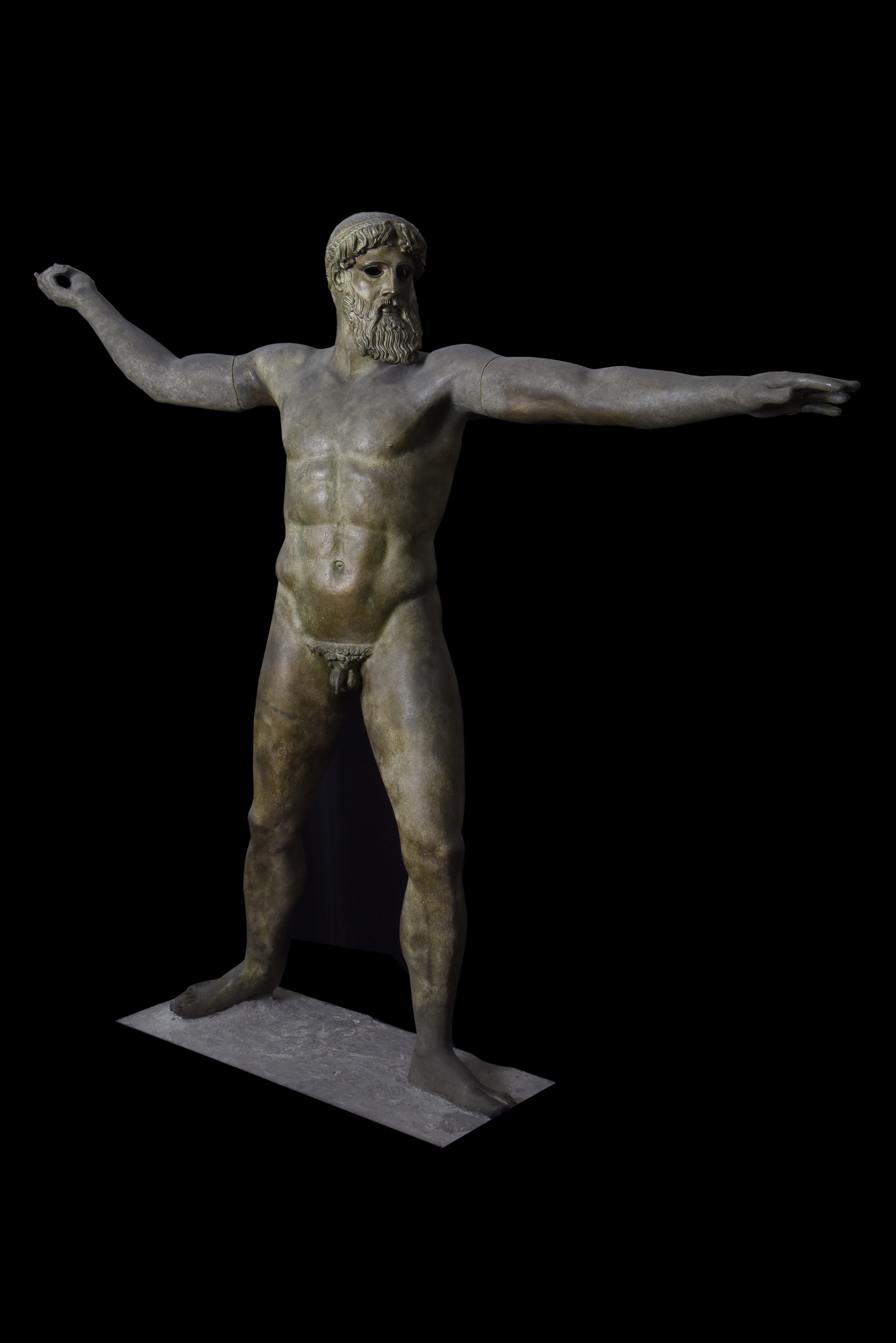

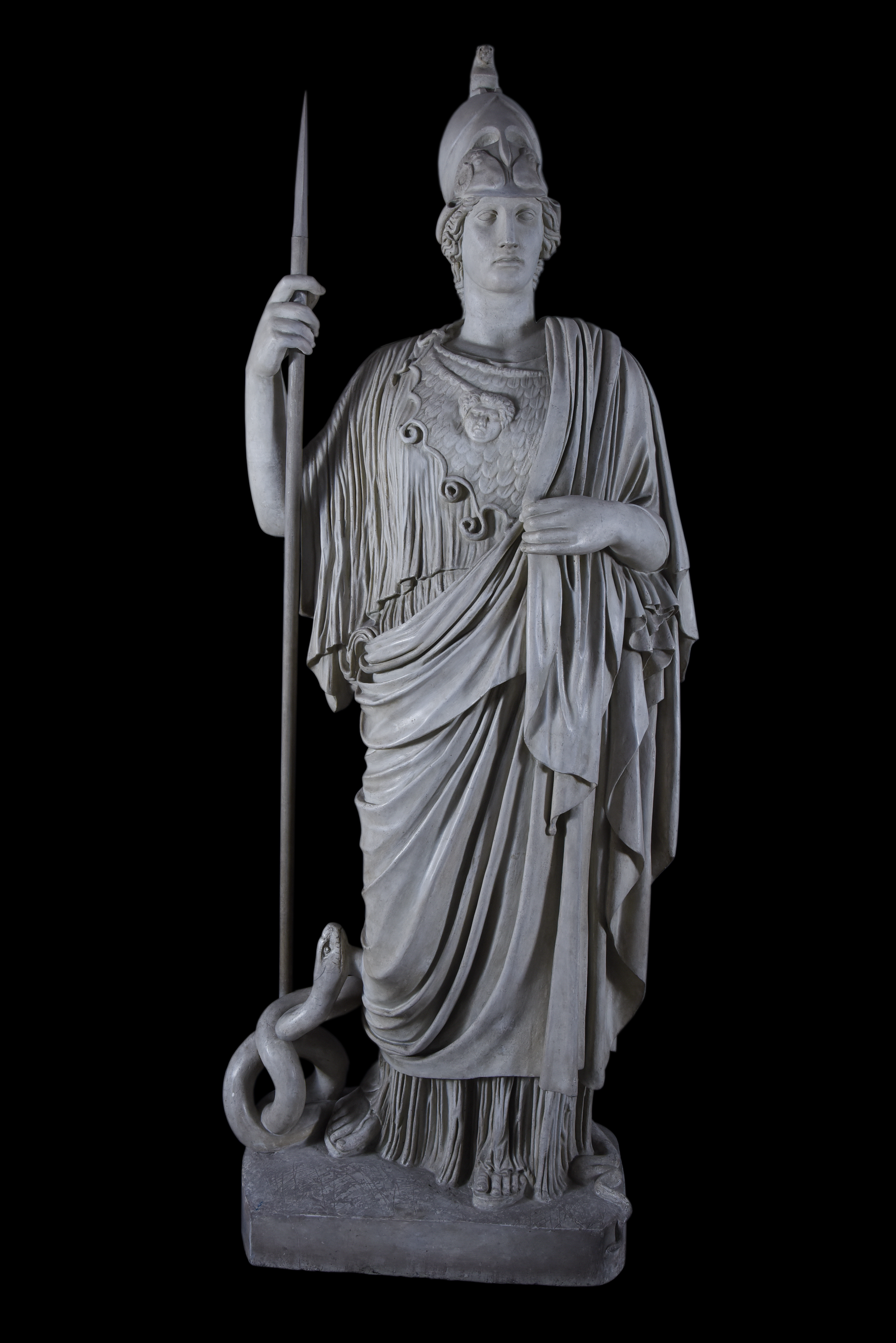

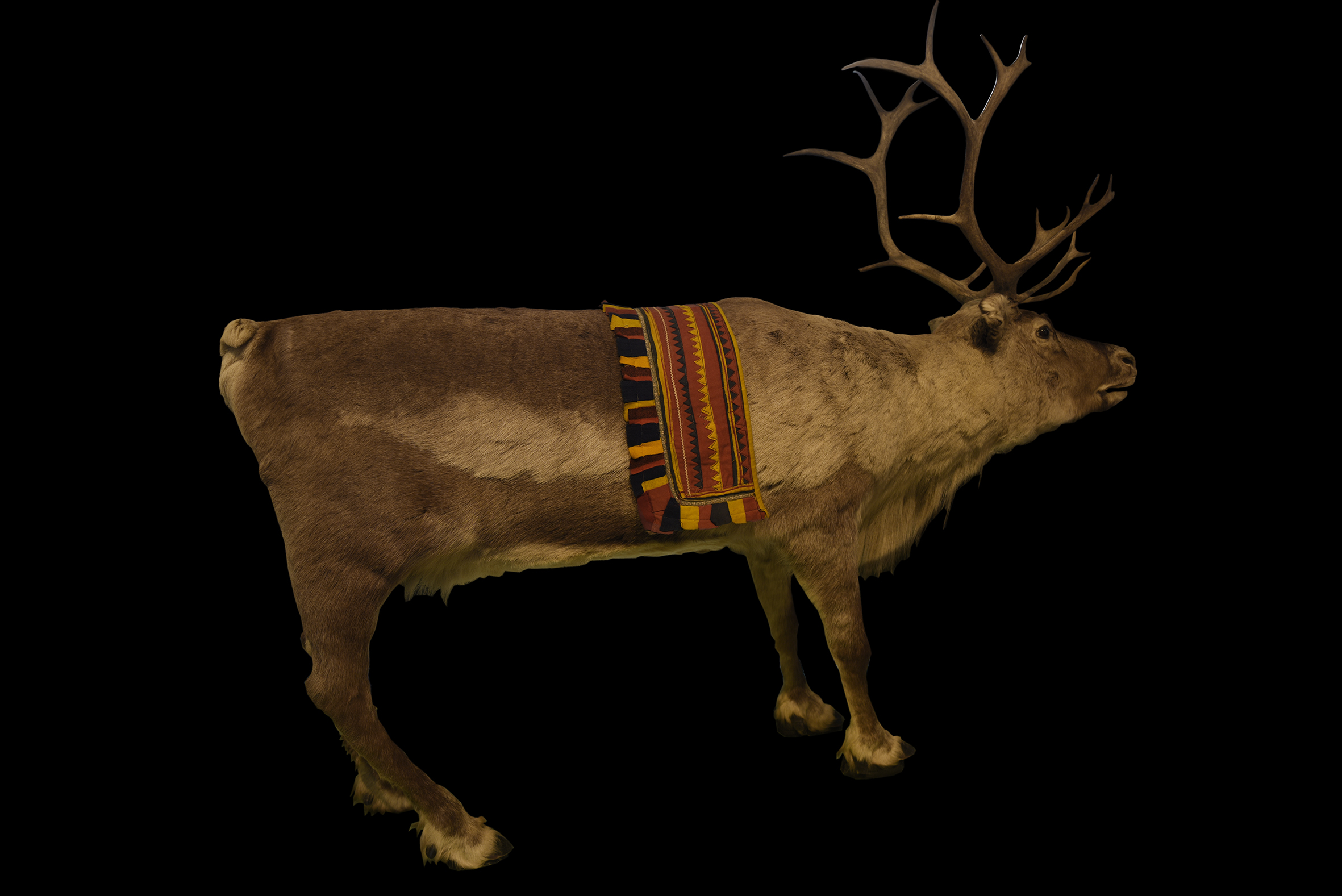

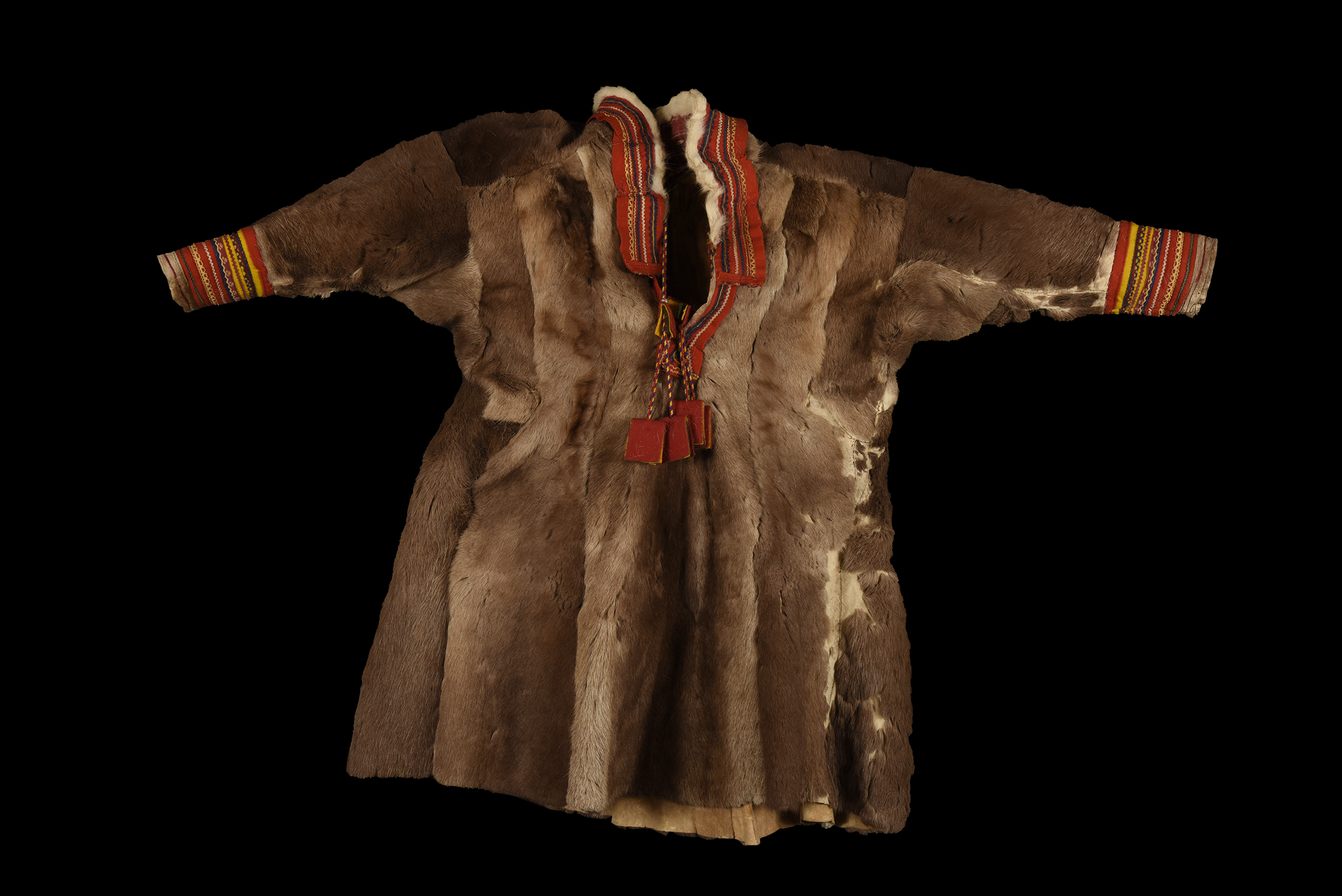

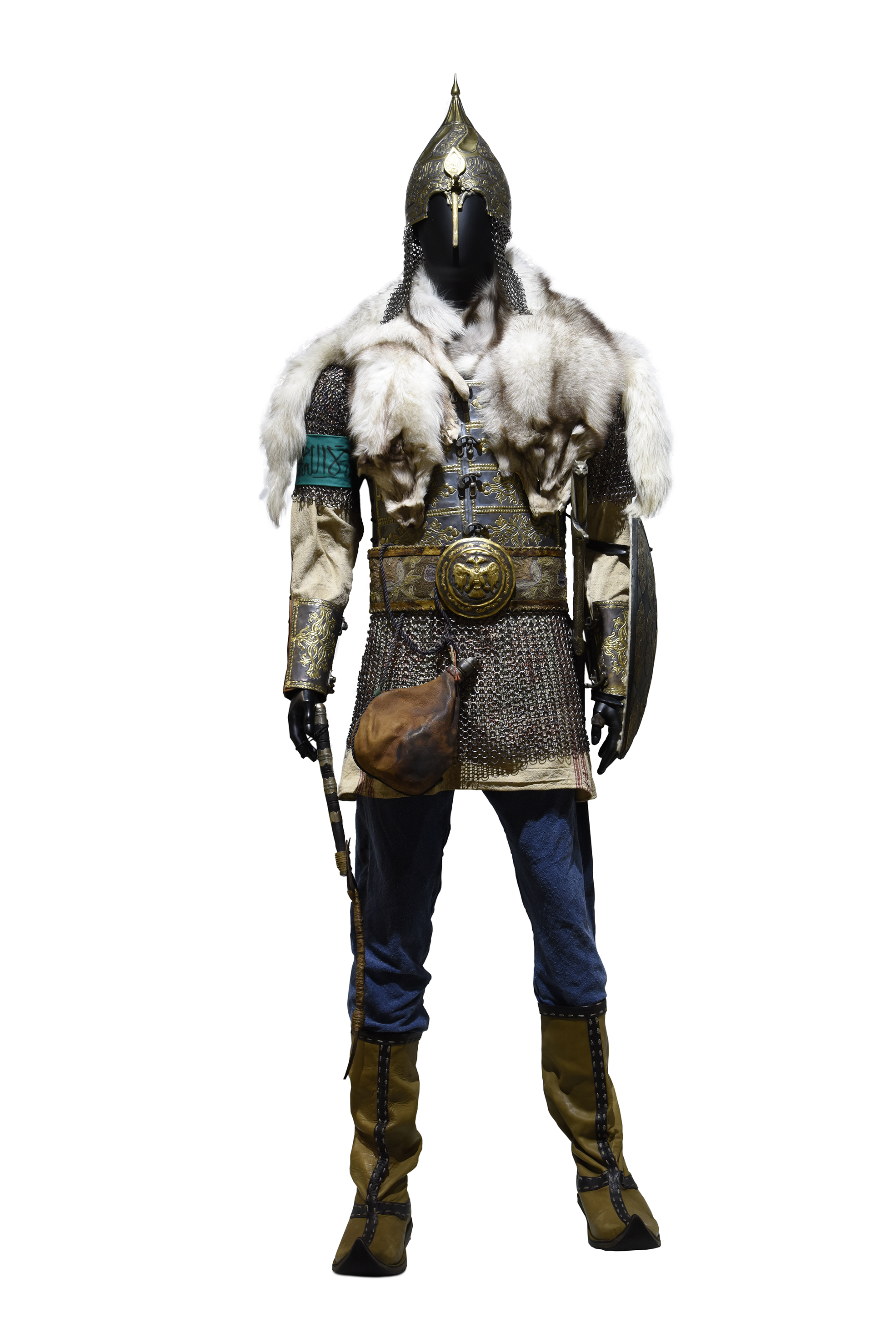

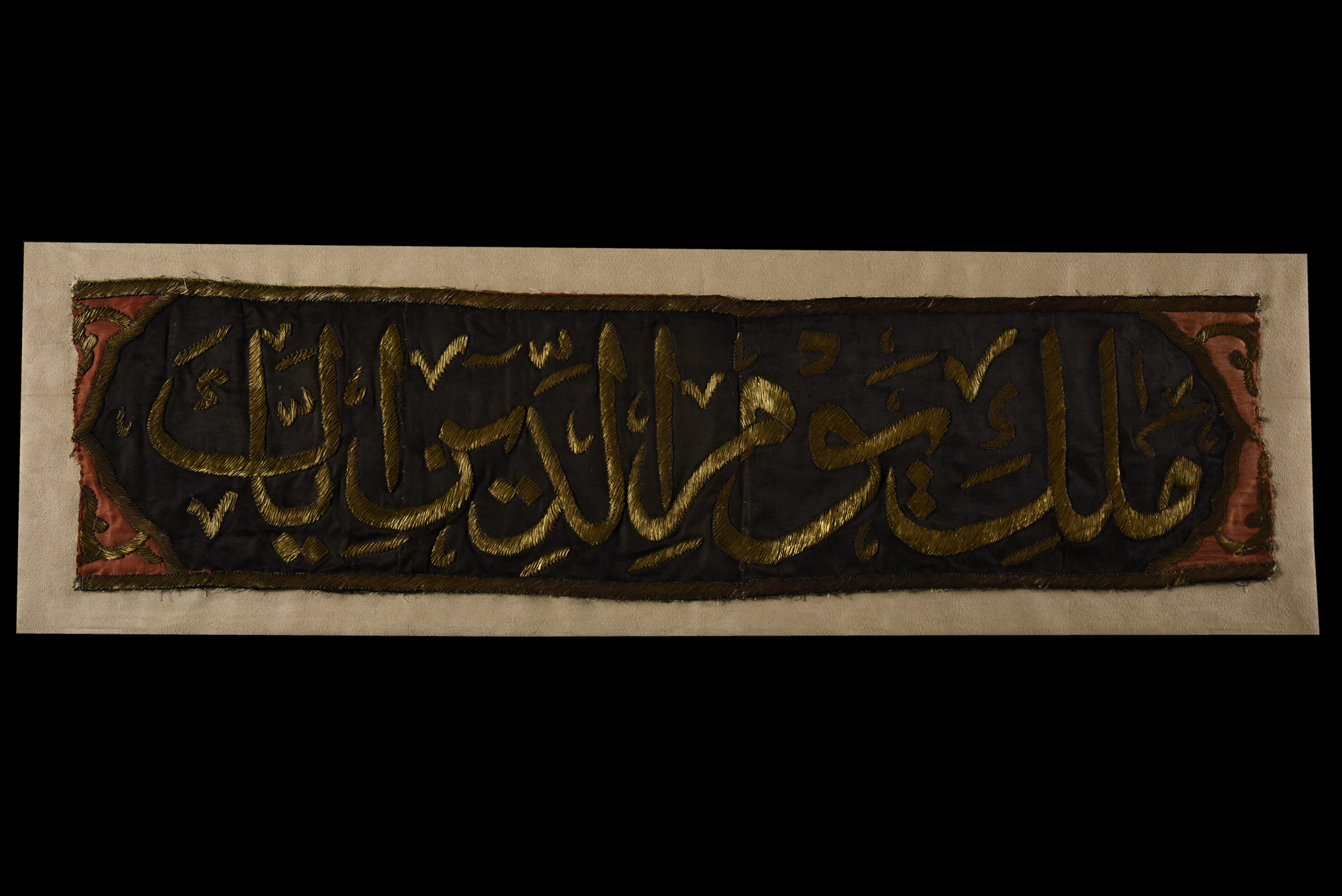

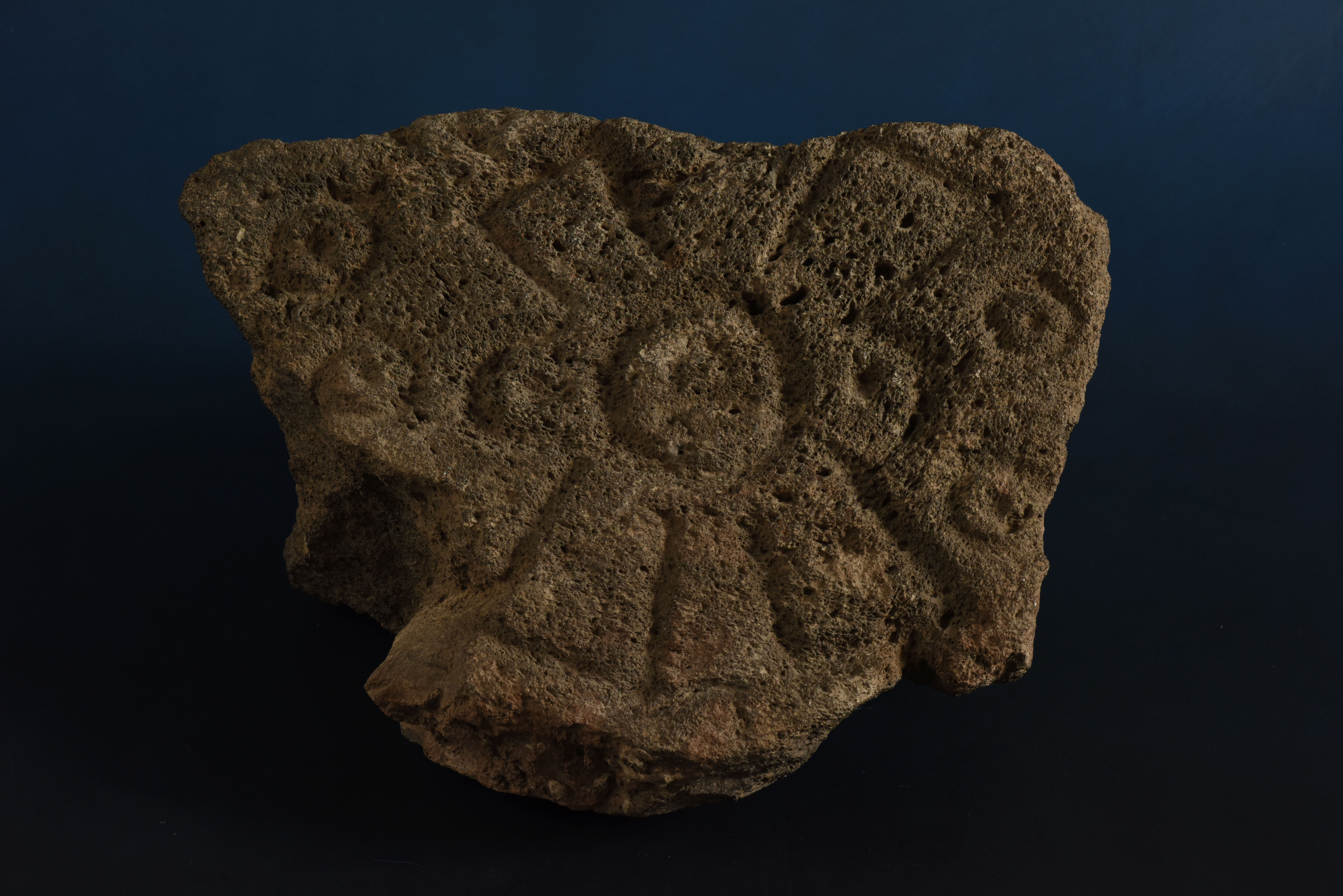

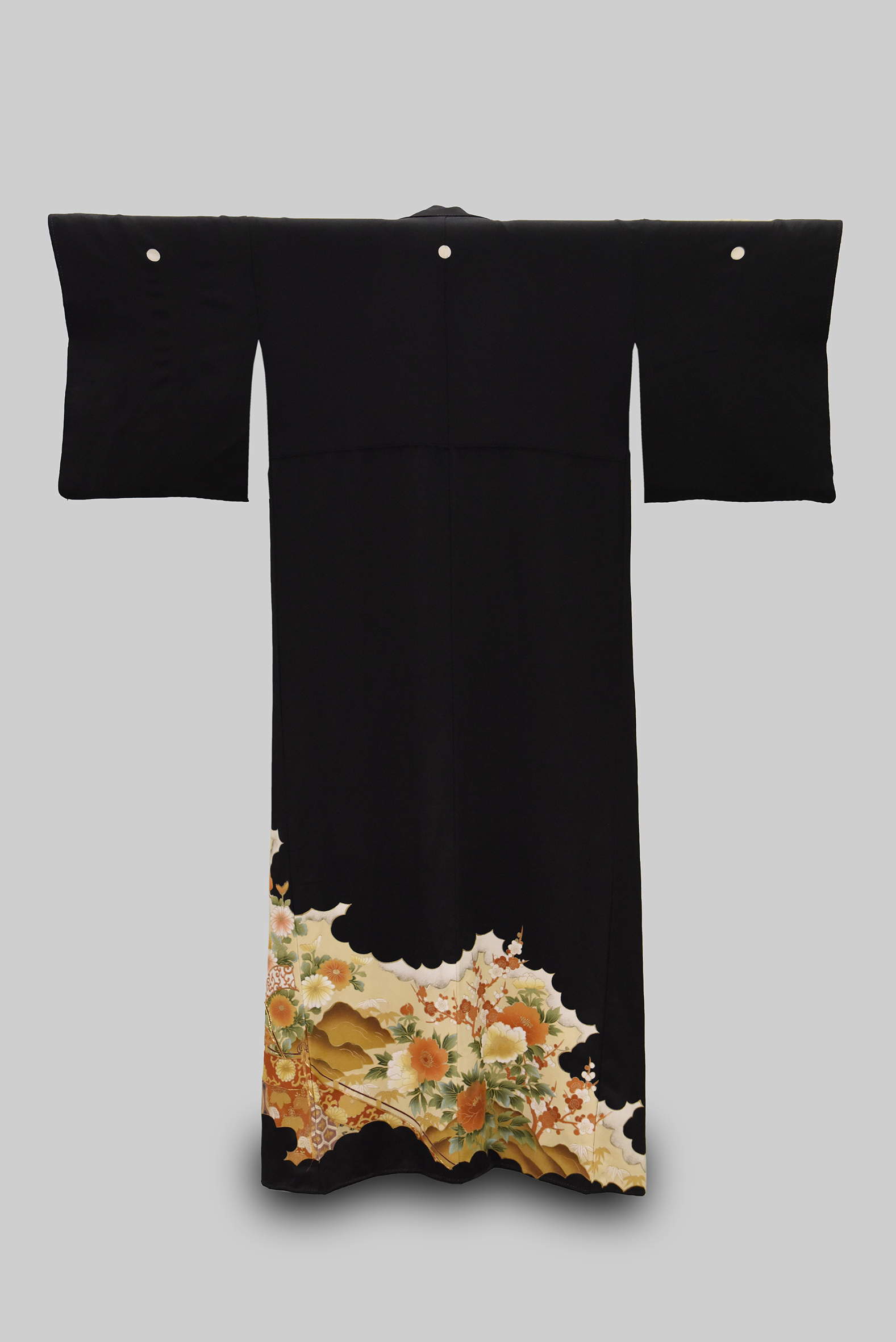

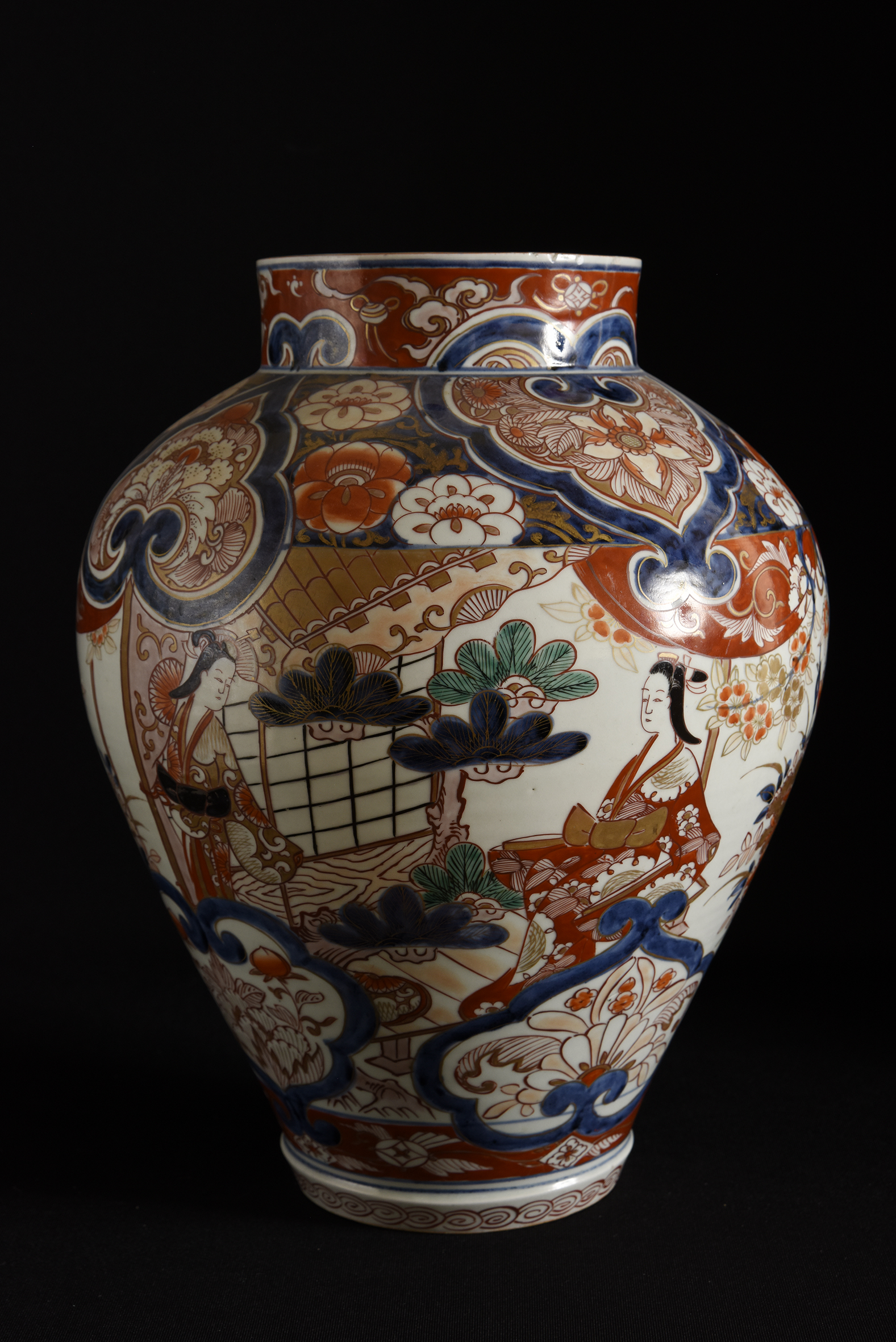

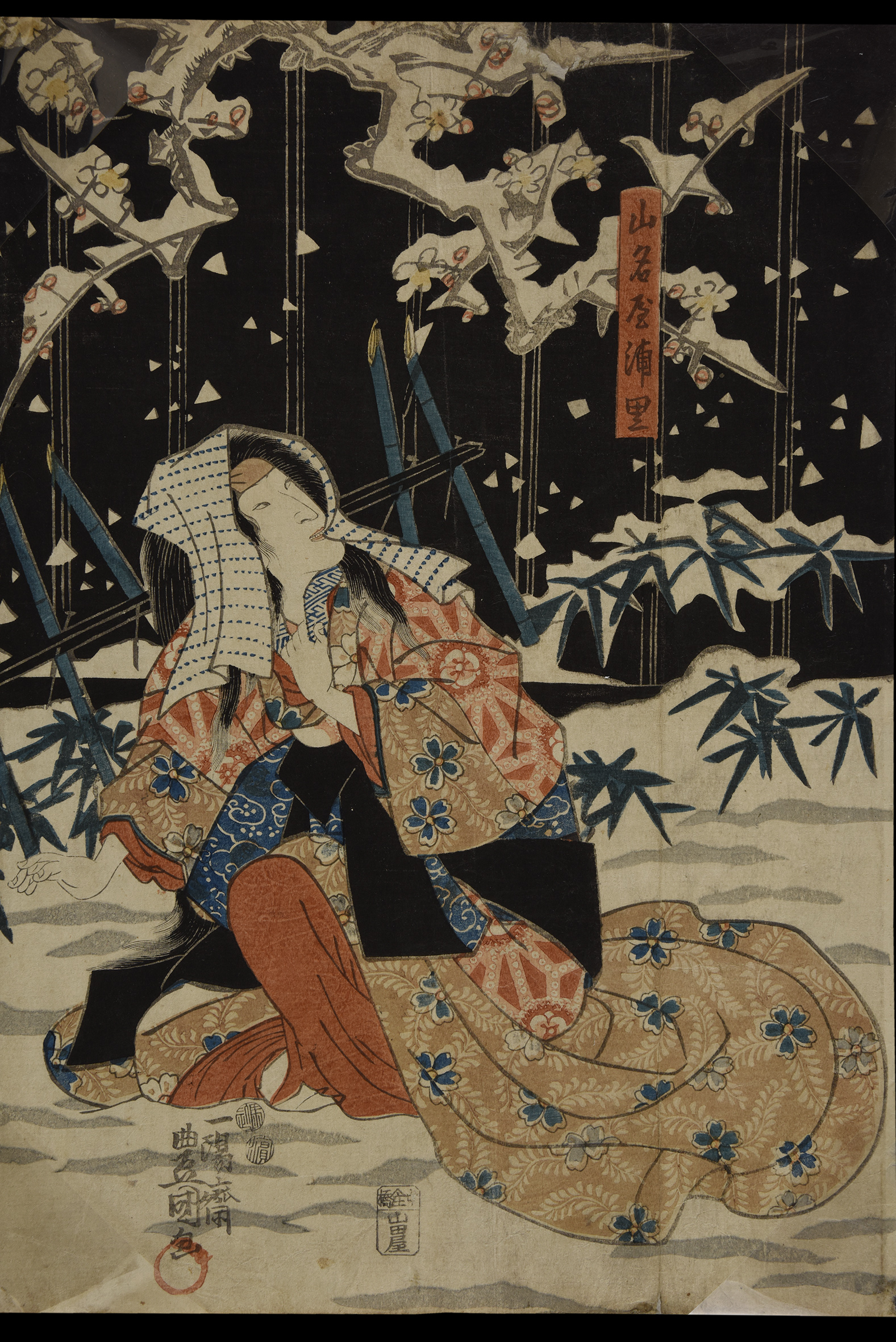
